= Aberdeen Bestiary =

12th-century English manuscript

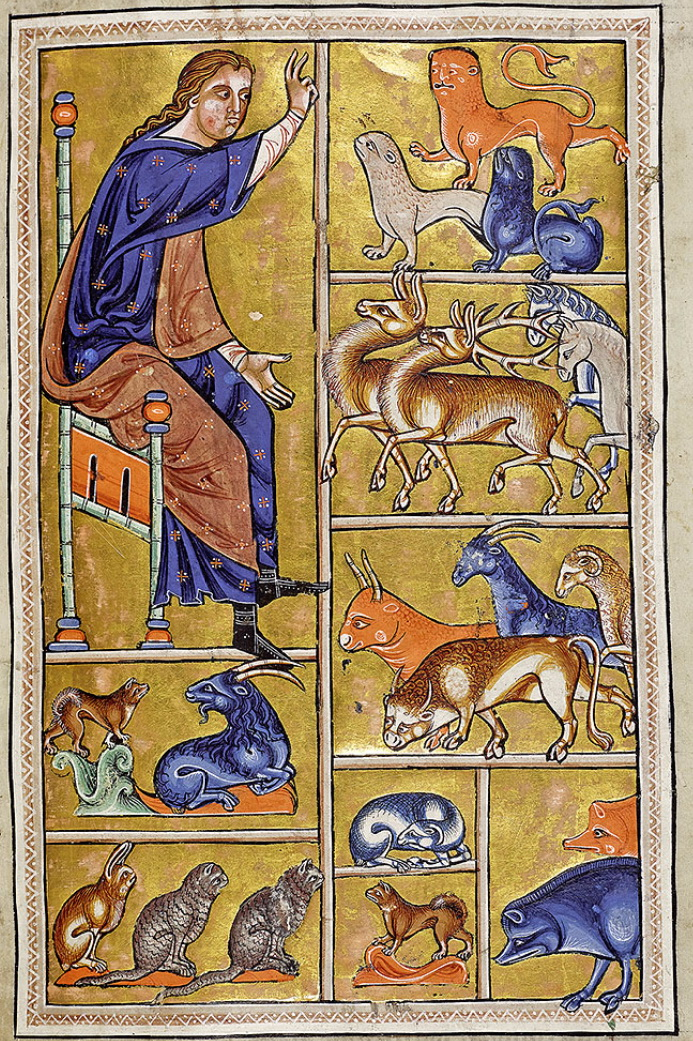
- Adam naming the beasts, in an illustration from the Aberdeen Bestiary
- Date: Early 13th Century
- Genre: Bestiary

The Aberdeen Bestiary (Aberdeen University Library, Univ Lib. MS 24) is a 12th-century English illuminated manuscript bestiary that was first listed in 1542 in the inventory of the Old Royal Library at the Palace of Westminster. Due to similarities, it is often considered to be the "sister" manuscript of the Ashmole Bestiary. The connection between the ancient Greek didactic text Physiologus and similar bestiary manuscripts is also often noted. Information about the manuscript's origins and patrons are circumstantial, although the manuscript most likely originated from the 13th century and was owned by a wealthy ecclesiastical patron from northern or southern England. Currently, the Aberdeen Bestiary resides in the Aberdeen University Library in Scotland.

== History ==
The Aberdeen Bestiary and the Ashmole Bestiary are considered by Xenia Muratova, a professor of Art History, to be "the work of different artists belonging to the same artistic milieu." Due to their "striking similarities" they are often compared and described by scholars as being "sister manuscripts." The medievalist scholar M. R. James considered the Aberdeen Bestiary ''a replica of Ashmole 1511" a view echoed by many other art historians.

=== Provenance ===
The original patron of both the Aberdeen and Ashmole Bestiary was considered to be a high-ranking member of society such as a prince, king or another high ranking church official or monastery. However, since the section related to monastery life that was commonly depicted within the Aviarium manuscript was missing the original patron remains uncertain but it appears less likely to be a church member. The Aberdeen Bestiary was kept in Church and monastic settings for a majority of its history. However at some point it entered into the English royal collections library. The royal Westminster Library shelf stamp of Henry VIII is stamped on the side of the bestiary. How King Henry acquired the manuscript remains unknown although it was probably taken from a monastery. The manuscript appears to have been well-read by the family based on the amount of reading wear on the edges of the pages. Around the time King James of Scotland became the King of England the bestiary was passed along to Marischal College in Aberdeen, Scotland. The manuscript is in fragmented condition as many illuminations on folios were removed individually as miniatures likely not for monetary but possibly for personal reasons. The manuscript currently is in the Aberdeen Library in Scotland where it has remained since 1542.

== Description ==
=== Materials ===
The Aberdeen bestiary is a gilded, decorated manuscript featuring large miniatures and some of the finest pigment, parchment and gold leaf from its time. Some portions of the manuscript such as folio eight recto even feature tarnished silver leaf. The original patron was wealthy enough to afford such materials so that the artists and scribes could enjoy creative freedom while creating the manuscripts. The artists were professionally trained and experimented with new techniques - such as heavy washes mixed with light washes and dark thick lines and use of contrasting color. The aqua color that is in the Aberdeen Bestiary is not present in the Ashmole Bestiary. The Aberdeen manuscript is loaded with filigree flora design and champie style gold leaf initials. Canterbury is considered to be the original location of manufacture as the location was well known for manufacturing high-end luxury books during the thirteen century. Its similarities with the Canterbury Paris Psalter tree style also further draws evidence of this relation.

=== Style ===
The craftsmanship of both Ashmole and Aberdeen bestiary suggest similar artists and scribes. Both the Ashmole and Aberdeen bestiary were probably made within 10 years of each other due to their stylistic and material similarities and the fact that both are crafted with the finest materials of their time. Stylistically both manuscripts are very similar but the Aberdeen has figures that are both more voluminous and less energetic than those of the Ashmole Bestiary. The color usage has been suggested as potentially Biblical in meaning as color usage had different interpretations in the early 13th century. The overall style of the human figures as well as color usage is very reminiscent of Roman mosaic art especially with the attention to detail in the drapery. Circles and ovals semi-realistically depict highlights throughout the manuscript. The way that animals are shaded in a Romanesque fashion with the use of bands to depict volume and form, which is similar to an earlier 12th-century Bury Bible made at Bury St.Edmunds. This Bestiary also shows stylistic similarities with the Paris Psalters of Canterbury. The Aviary section is similar to the Aviariium which is a well-known 12th century monastic text. The deviation from traditional color usage can be seen in the tiger, satyr, and unicorn folios as well as many other folios. The satyr in the Aberdeen Bestiary when compared to the satyr section of the slightly older Worksop bestiary is almost identical. There are small color notes in the Aberdeen Bestiary that are often seen in similar manuscripts dating between 1175 and 1250 which help indicate that it was made near the year 1200 or 1210. These notes are similar to many other side notes written on the sides of pages throughout the manuscript and were probably by the painter to remind himself of special circumstances, these note occur irregularly throughout the text.

=== Illuminations ===
Folio page 1 to 3 recto depicts the Genesis 1:1-25 which is represented with a large full page illumination Biblical Creation scene in the manuscript. Folio 5 recto shows Adam, a large figure surrounded by gold leaf and towering over others, with the theme of 'Adam naming the animals' - this starts the compilation of the bestiary portion within the manuscript. Folio 5 verso depicts quadrupeds, livestock, wild beasts, and the concept of the herd. Folio 7 to 18 recto depicts large cats and other beasts such as wolves, foxes and dogs. Many pages from the start of the manuscript's bestiary section such as 11 verso featuring a hyena shows small pin holes which were likely used to map out and copy artwork to a new manuscript. Folio 20 verso to 28 recto depicts livestock such as sheep, horses, and goats. Small animals like cats and mice are depicted on folio 24 to 25. Pages 25 recto to 63 recto feature depictions of birds and folio 64 recto to 80 recto depicts reptiles, worms and fish. 77 recto to 91 verso depicts trees and plants and other elements of nature such as the nature of man. The end folios of the manuscript from 93 recto to 100 recto depicts the nature of stones and rocks.

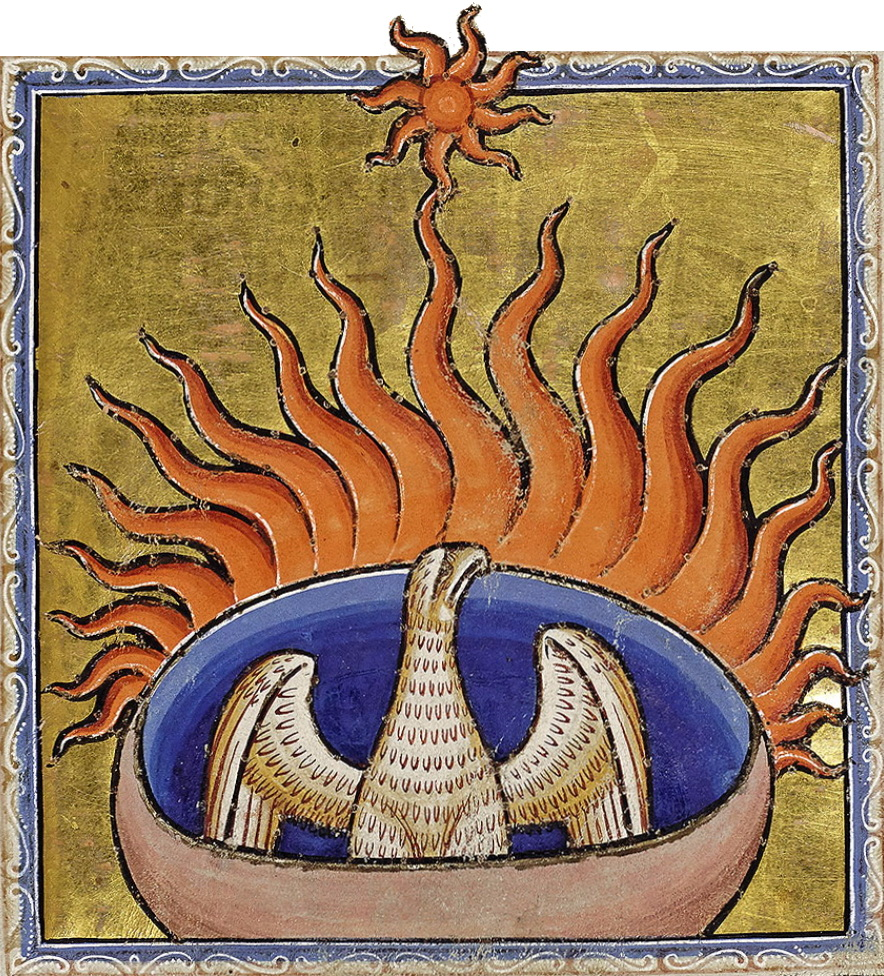
Folio 56 Recto - Phoenix (detail)

Seventeen of the Aberdeen manuscript pages are pricked for transfer in a process called pouncing such as clearly seen in the hyena folio as well as folio 3 recto and 3 verso depicting Genesis 1:26-1:28, 31, 1:1-2. The pricking must have been done shortly after the creation of the Adam and Eve folio pages since there is not damage done to nearby pages. Other pages used for pouncing include folio 7 recto to 18 verso which is the beginning of the beasts portion of the manuscript and likely depicted a lions as well as other big cats such as leopards, panthers and their characteristic as well as other large wild and domesticated beasts.

=== Missing Folios ===
On folio 6 recto there was likely intended to be a depiction of a lion as in the Ashmole bestiary, but in this instance the pages were left blank although there are markings of margin lines. In comparison to the Ashmole bestiary, on 9 verso some leaves are missing which should have likely contained imagery of the antelope (Antalops), unicorn (Unicornis), lynx (Lynx), griffin (Gryps), part of elephant (Elephans). Near folio 21 verso two illuminations of the ox (Bos), camel (Camelus), dromedary (Dromedarius), ass (Asinus), onager (Onager) and part of horse (Equus) are also assumed to be missing. Also missing from folio 15 recto on are some leaves which should have contained crocodile (Crocodilus), manticore (Mantichora) and part of parandrus (Parandrus). These missing folios are assumed from comparisons between the Ashmole and other related bestiaries.

== Contents ==
- Folio 1 recto : Genesis creation narrative of heaven and earth (Genesis, 1: 1–5). (Full page)
- Folio 1 verso: Creation of the waters and the firmament (Genesis, 1: 6–8)
- Folio 2 recto : Creation of the birds and fish (Genesis, 1: 20–23)
- Folio 2 verso : Creation of the animals (Genesis, 1: 24–25)
- Folio 3 recto : Creation of man (Genesis, 1: 26–28, 31; 2: 1–2)
- Folio 5 recto : Adam names the animals (Isidore of Seville, Etymologiae, Book XII, i, 1–2)
- Folio 5 verso : Animal (Animal) (Isidore of Seville, Etymologiae, Book XII, i, 3)
- Folio 5 verso : Quadruped (Quadrupes) (Isidore of Seville, Etymologiae, Book XII, i, 4)
- Folio 5 verso : Livestock (Pecus) (Isidore of Seville, Etymologiae, Book XII, i, 5–6)
- Folio 5 verso : Beast of burden (Iumentum) (Isidore of Seville, Etymologiae, Book XII, i, 7)
- Folio 5 verso : Herd (Armentum) (Isidore of Seville, Etymologiae, Book XII, i, 8)

=== Beasts (Bestiae) ===
- Folio 7 recto : Lion (Leo) (Physiologus, Chapter 1; Isidore of Seville, Etymologiae, Book XII, ii, 3–6)
- Folio 8 recto : Tiger (Tigris) (Isidore of Seville, Etymologiae, Book XII, ii, 7)
- Folio 8 verso : Pard (Pard) (Isidore of Seville, Etymologiae, Book XII, ii, 10–11)
- Folio 9 recto : Panther (Panther) (Physiologus, Chapter 16; Isidore of Seville, Etymologiae, Book XII, ii, 8–9)
- Folio 10 recto : Elephant (Elephans) (Isidore of Seville, Etymologiae, Book XII, ii, 14; Physiologus, Chapter 43; Ambrose, Hexaemeron, Book VI, 35; Solinus, Collectanea rerum memorabilium, xxv, 1–7)
- Folio 11 recto : Beaver (Castor)
- Folio 11 recto : Ibex (Ibex) (Hugh of Fouilloy, II, 15)
- Folio 11 verso : Hyena (Yena) (Physiologus, Chapter 24; Solinus, Collectanea rerum memorabilium, xxvii, 23–24)
- Folio 12 recto : Crocotta (Crocotta) (Solinus, Collectanea rerum memorabilium, xxvii, 26)
- Folio 12 recto : Bonnacon (Bonnacon) (Solinus, Collectanea rerum memorabilium, xl, 10–11)
- Folio 12 verso : Ape (Simia)
- Folio 13 recto : Satyr (Satyrs)
- Folio 13 recto : Deer (Cervus)
- Folio 14 recto : Goat (Caper)
- Folio 14 verso : Wild goat (Caprea)
- Folio 15 recto : Monoceros (Monoceros) (Solinus, Collectanea rerum memorabilium, lii, 39–40)
- Folio 15 recto : Bear (Ursus)
- Folio 15 verso : Leucrota (Leucrota) (Solinus, Collectanea rerum memorabilium, lii, 34)
- Folio 16 recto : Parandrus (Parandrus) (Solinus, Collectanea rerum memorabilium, xxx, 25)
- Folio 16 recto : Fox (Vulpes)
- Folio 16 verso : Yale (Eale) (Solinus, Collectanea rerum memorabilium, lii, 35)
- Folio 16 verso : Wolf (Lupus)
- Folio 18 recto : Dog (Canis)

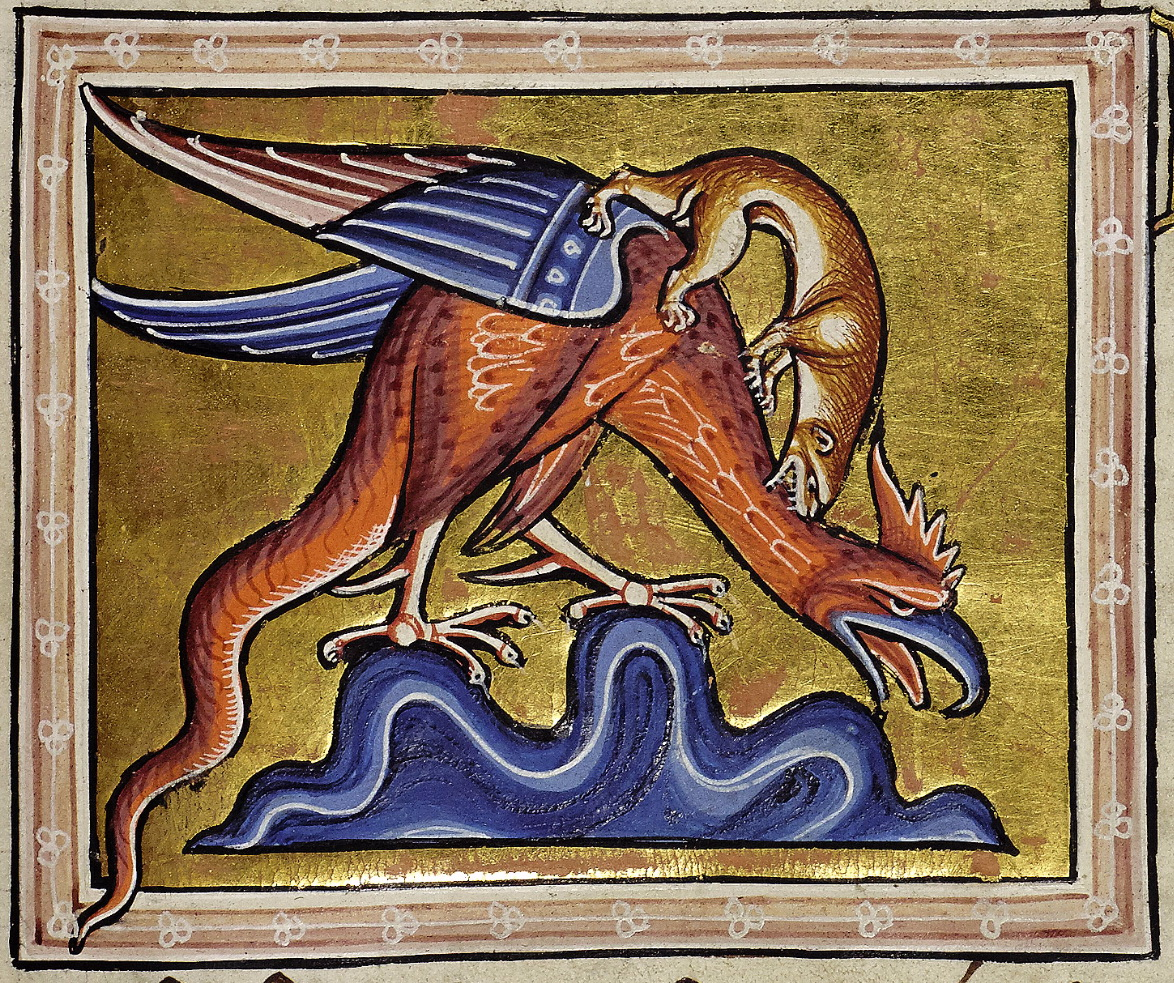
Folio 66 Recto - Basilisk (detail)

=== Livestock (Pecora) ===
- Folio 20 verso : Sheep (Ovis) (Isidore of Seville, Etymologiae, Book XII, i, 9; Ambrose, Hexaemeron, Book VI, 20)
- Folio 21 recto : Wether (Vervex) (Isidore of Seville, Etymologiae, Book XII, i, 10)
- Folio 21 recto : Ram (Aries) (Isidore of Seville, Etymologiae, Book XII, i, 11)
- Folio 21 recto : Lamb (Agnus) (Isidore of Seville, Etymologiae, Book XII, i, 12; Ambrose, Hexaemeron, Book VI, 28)
- Folio 21 recto : He-goat (Hircus) (Isidore of Seville, Etymologiae, Book XII, i, 14)
- Folio 21 verso : Kid (Hedus) (Isidore of Seville, Etymologiae, Book XII, i, 13)
- Folio 21 verso : Boar (Aper) (Isidore of Seville, Etymologiae, Book XII, i, 27)
- Folio 21 verso : Bullock (Iuvencus) (Isidore of Seville, Etymologiae, Book XII, i, 28)
- Folio 21 verso : Bull (Taurus) (Isidore of Seville, Etymologiae, Book XII, i, 29)
- Folio 22 recto : Horse (Equus) (Isidore of Seville, Etymologiae, Book XII, i, 41–56; Hugh of Fouilloy, III, xxiii)
- Folio 23 recto : Mule (Mulus) (Isidore of Seville, Etymologiae, Book XII, i, 57–60)

=== Small animals (Minuta animala) ===
- Folio 23 verso : Cat (Musio) (Isidore of Seville, Etymologiae, Book XII, ii, 38)
- Folio 23 verso : Mouse (Mus) (Isidore of Seville, Etymologiae, Book XII, iii, 1)
- Folio 23 verso : Weasel (Mustela) (Isidore of Seville, Etymologiae, Book XII, iii, 2; Physiologus, Chapter 21)
- Folio 24 recto : Mole (Talpa) (Isidore of Seville, Etymologiae, Book XII, iii, 5)
- Folio 24 recto : Hedgehog (Ericius) (Isidore of Seville, Etymologiae, Book XII, iii, 7; Ambrose, Hexaemeron, VI, 20)
- Folio 24 verso : Ant (Formica) (Physiologus, 12; Ambrose, Hexaemeron, Book VI, 16, 20)

=== Birds (Aves) ===
- Folio 25 recto : Bird (Avis)
- Folio 25 verso : Dove (Columba)
- Folio 26 recto : Dove and hawk (Columba et Accipiter)
- Folio 26 verso : Dove (Columba)
- Folio 29 verso : North wind and South wind (Aquilo et Auster ventus)
- Folio 30 recto : Hawk (Accipiter)
- Folio 31 recto : Turtle dove (Turtur)
- Folio 32 verso : Palm tree (Palma)
- Folio 33 verso : Cedar (Cedrus)
- Folio 34 verso : Pelican (Pellicanus) - Orange and blue
- Folio 35 verso : Night heron (Nicticorax)
- Folio 36 recto : Hoopoe (Epops)
- Folio 36 verso : Magpie (Pica)
- Folio 37 recto : Raven (Corvus)
- Folio 38 verso : Cock (Gallus)
- Folio 41 recto : Ostrich (Strutio)
- Folio 44 recto : Vulture (Vultur)
- Folio 45 verso : Crane (Grus)
- Folio 46 verso : Kite (Milvus)
- Folio 46 verso : Parrot (Psitacus)
- Folio 47 recto : Ibis (Ibis)
- Folio 47 verso : Swallow (Yrundo)
- Folio 48 verso : Stork (Ciconia)
- Folio 49 verso : Blackbird (Merula)
- Folio 50 recto : Eagle-owl (Bubo)
- Folio 50 verso : Hoopoe (Hupupa)
- Folio 51 recto : Little owl (Noctua)
- Folio 51 recto : Bat (Vespertilio)
- Folio 51 verso : Jay (Gragulus)
- Folio 52 verso : Nightingale (Lucinia)
- Folio 53 recto : Goose (Anser)
- Folio 53 verso : Heron (Ardea)
- Folio 54 recto : Partridge (Perdix)
- Folio 54 verso : Halcyon (Alcyon)
- Folio 55 recto : Coot (Fulica)
- Folio 55 recto : Phoenix (Fenix)
- Folio 56 verso : Caladrius (Caladrius)
- Folio 57 verso : Quail (Coturnix)
- Folio 58 recto : Crow (Cornix)
- Folio 58 verso : Swan (Cignus)
- Folio 59 recto : Duck (Anas)
- Folio 59 verso : Peacock (Pavo)
- Folio 61 recto : Eagle (Aquila)
- Folio 63 recto : Bee (Apis)

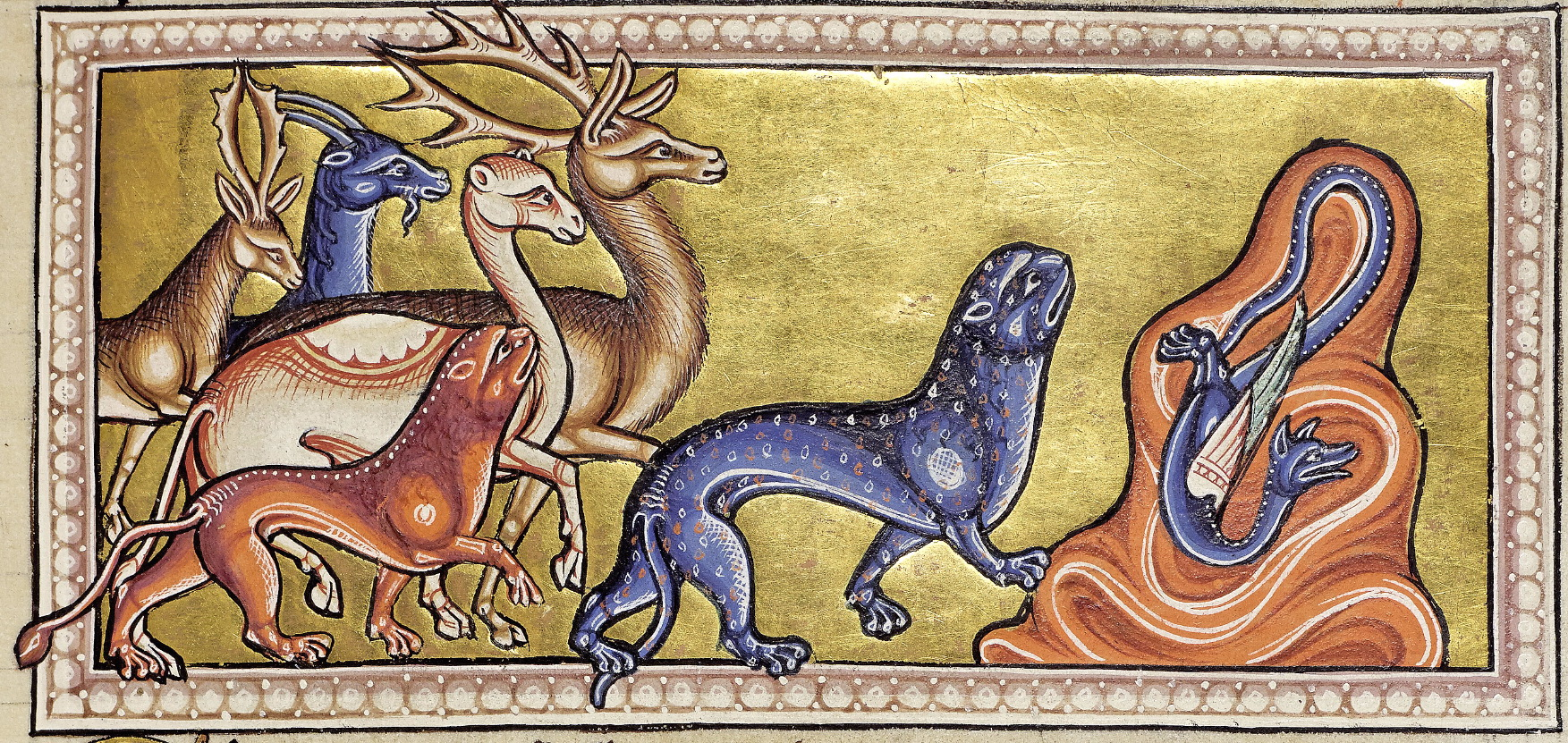
Folio 9 Recto - Panther (detail)

=== Snakes and Reptiles (Serpentes) ===
- Folio 64 verso : Peridexion tree (Perindens)
- Folio 65 verso : Snake (Serpens)
- Folio 65 verso : Dragon (Draco)
- Folio 66 recto : Basilisk (Basiliscus)
- Folio 66 verso : Regulus (Regulus)
- Folio 66 verso : Viper (Vipera)
- Folio 67 verso : Asp (Aspis)
- Folio 68 verso : Scitalis (Scitalis)
- Folio 68 verso : Amphisbaena (Anphivena)
- Folio 68 verso : Hydrus (Ydrus)
- Folio 69 recto : Boa (Boa)
- Folio 69 recto : Iaculus (Iaculus)
- Folio 69 verso : Siren (Siren)
- Folio 69 verso : Seps (Seps)
- Folio 69 verso : Dipsa (Dipsa)
- Folio 69 verso : Lizard (Lacertus)
- Folio 69 verso : Salamander (Salamandra)
- Folio 70 recto : Saura (Saura)
- Folio 70 verso : Newt (Stellio)
- Folio 71 recto : Of the nature of Snakes (De natura serpentium)

=== Worms (Vermes) ===
- Folio 72 recto : Worms (Vermis)

=== Fish (Pisces) ===
- Folio 72 verso : Fish (Piscis)
- Folio 73 recto : Whale (Balena)
- Folio 73 recto : Serra (Serra)
- Folio 73 recto : Dolphin (Delphinus)
- Folio 73 verso : Sea-pig (Porcus marinus)
- Folio 73 verso : Crocodile (Crocodrillus)
- Folio 73 verso : Mullet (Mullus)
- Folio 74 recto : Fish (Piscis)

=== Trees and Plants (Arbories) ===
- Folio 77 verso : Tree (Arbor)
- Folio 78 verso : Fig (Ficus)
- Folio 79 recto : Again of trees (Item de arboribus)
- Folio 79 recto : Mulberry
- Folio 79 recto : Sycamore
- Folio 79 recto : Hazel
- Folio 79 recto : Nuts
- Folio 79 recto : Almond
- Folio 79 recto : Chestnut
- Folio 79 recto : Oak
- Folio 79 verso : Beech
- Folio 79 verso : Carob
- Folio 79 verso : Pistachio
- Folio 79 verso : Pitch pine
- Folio 79 verso : Pine
- Folio 79 verso : Fir
- Folio 79 verso : Cedar
- Folio 80 recto : Cypress
- Folio 80 recto : Juniper
- Folio 80 recto : Plane
- Folio 80 recto : Oak
- Folio 80 recto : Ash
- Folio 80 recto : Alder
- Folio 80 verso : Elm
- Folio 80 verso : Poplar
- Folio 80 verso : Willow
- Folio 80 verso : Osier
- Folio 80 verso : Box

=== Nature of Man (Natura hominis) ===
- Folio 80 verso : Isidorus on the nature of man (Ysidorus de natura hominis)
- Folio 89 recto : Isidorus on the parts of man's body (Ysidorus de membris hominis)
- Folio 91 recto : Of the age of man (De etate hominis)

=== Stones (Lapides) ===
- Folio 93 verso : Fire-bearing stone (Lapis ignifer)
- Folio 94 verso : Adamas stone (Lapis adamas)
- Folio 96 recto : Myrmecoleon (Mermecoleon)
- Folio 96 verso : Verse (Versus)
- Folio 97 recto : Stone in the foundation of the wall (Lapis in fundamento muri)
- Folio 97 recto : The first stone, Jasper
- Folio 97 recto : The second stone, Sapphire
- Folio 97 recto : The third stone, Chalcedony
- Folio 97 verso : The fourth stone, Smaragdus
- Folio 98 recto : The fifth stone, Sardonyx
- Folio 98 recto : The sixth stone, Sard
- Folio 98 verso : The seventh stone, Chrysolite
- Folio 98 verso : The eighth stone, Beryl
- Folio 99 recto : The ninth stone, Topaz
- Folio 99 verso : The tenth stone, Chrysoprase
- Folio 99 verso : The eleventh stone, Hyacinth
- Folio 100 recto : The twelfth stone, Amethyst
- Folio 100 recto : Of stones and what they can do (De effectu lapidum)

== Gallery ==
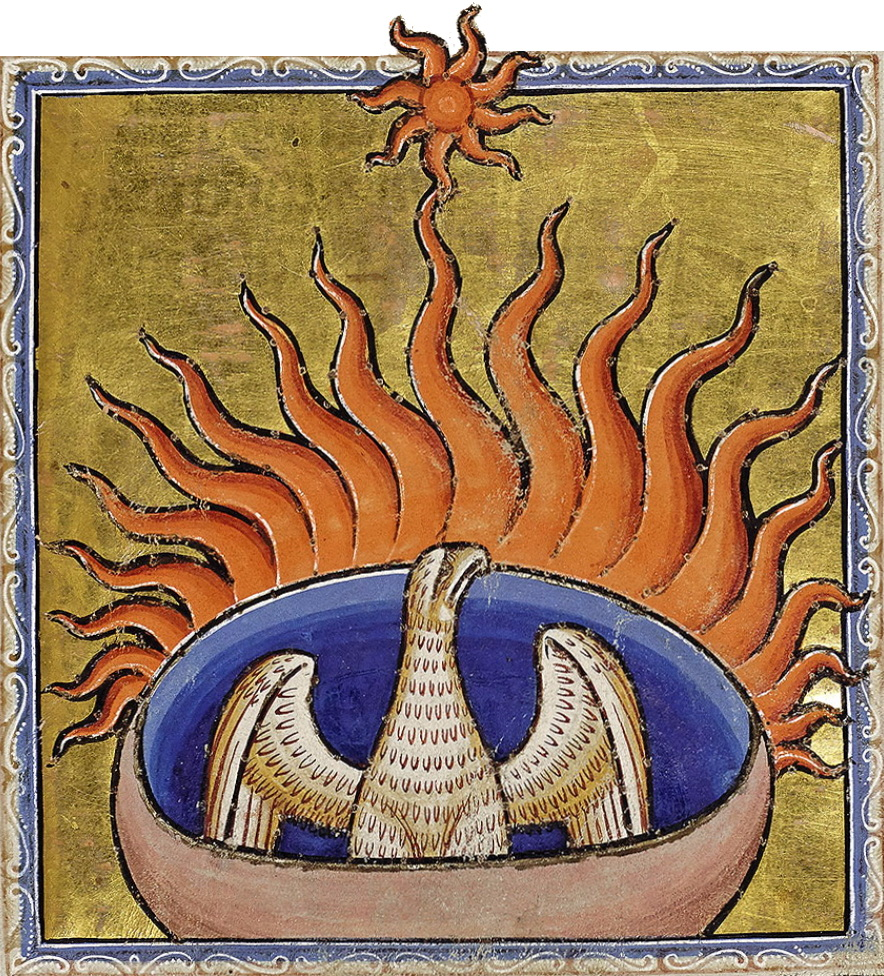
Folio 56 Recto - Phoenix (detail)

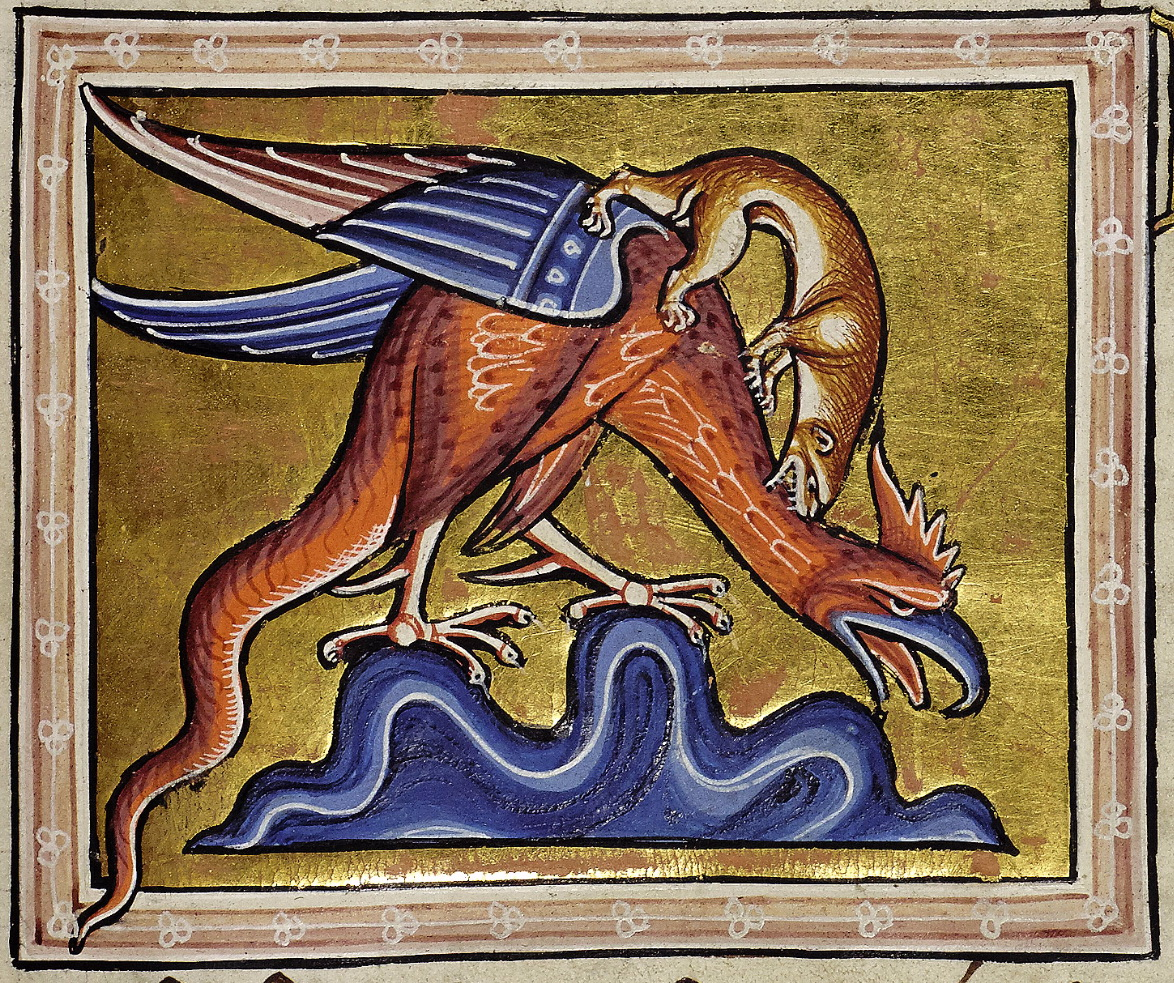
Folio 66 Recto - Basilisk (detail)

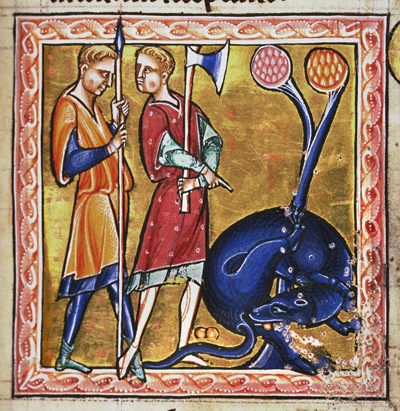
Folio 11 Recto - Beaver (detail)

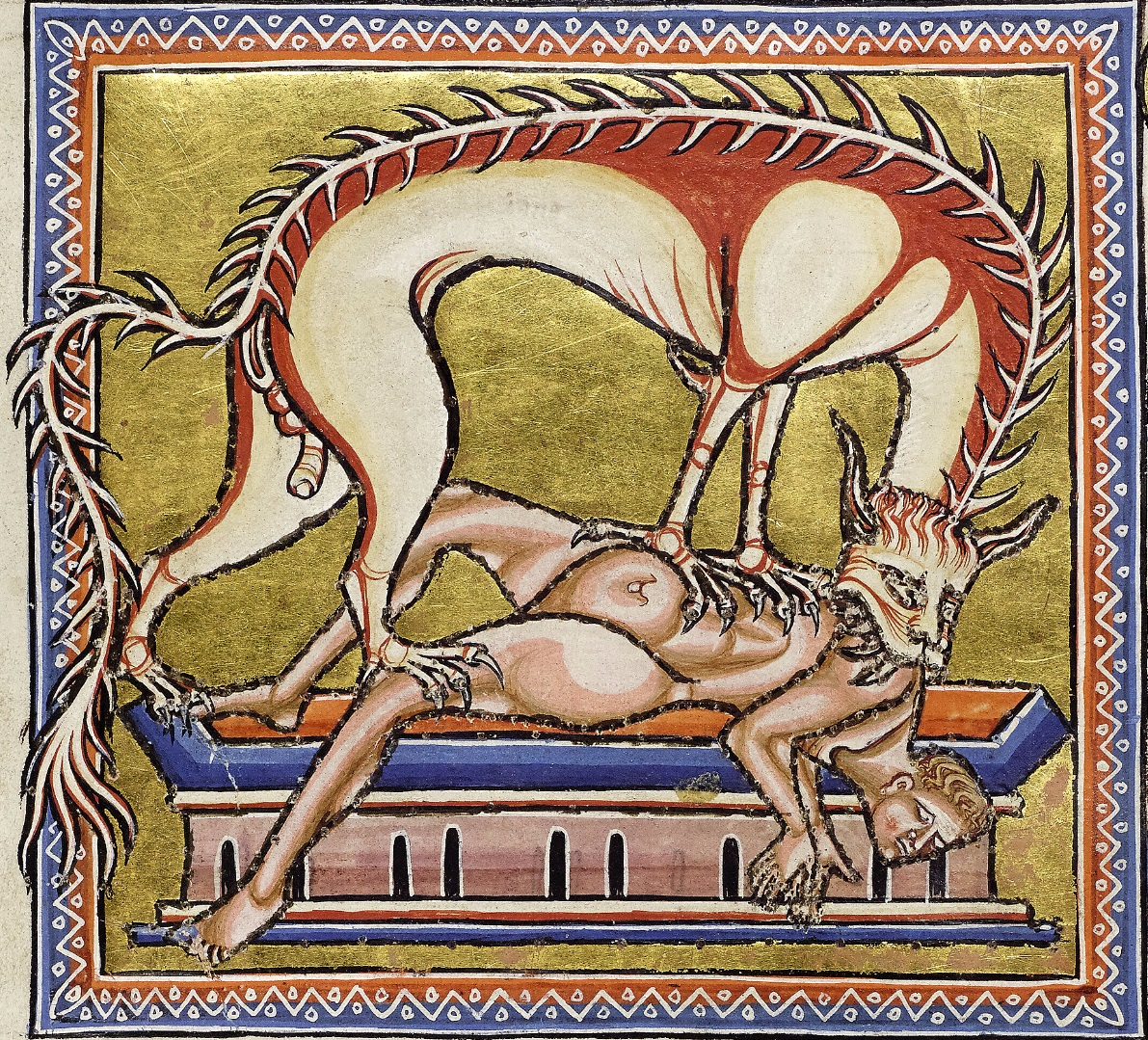
Folio 11 Verso - Hyena (detail)

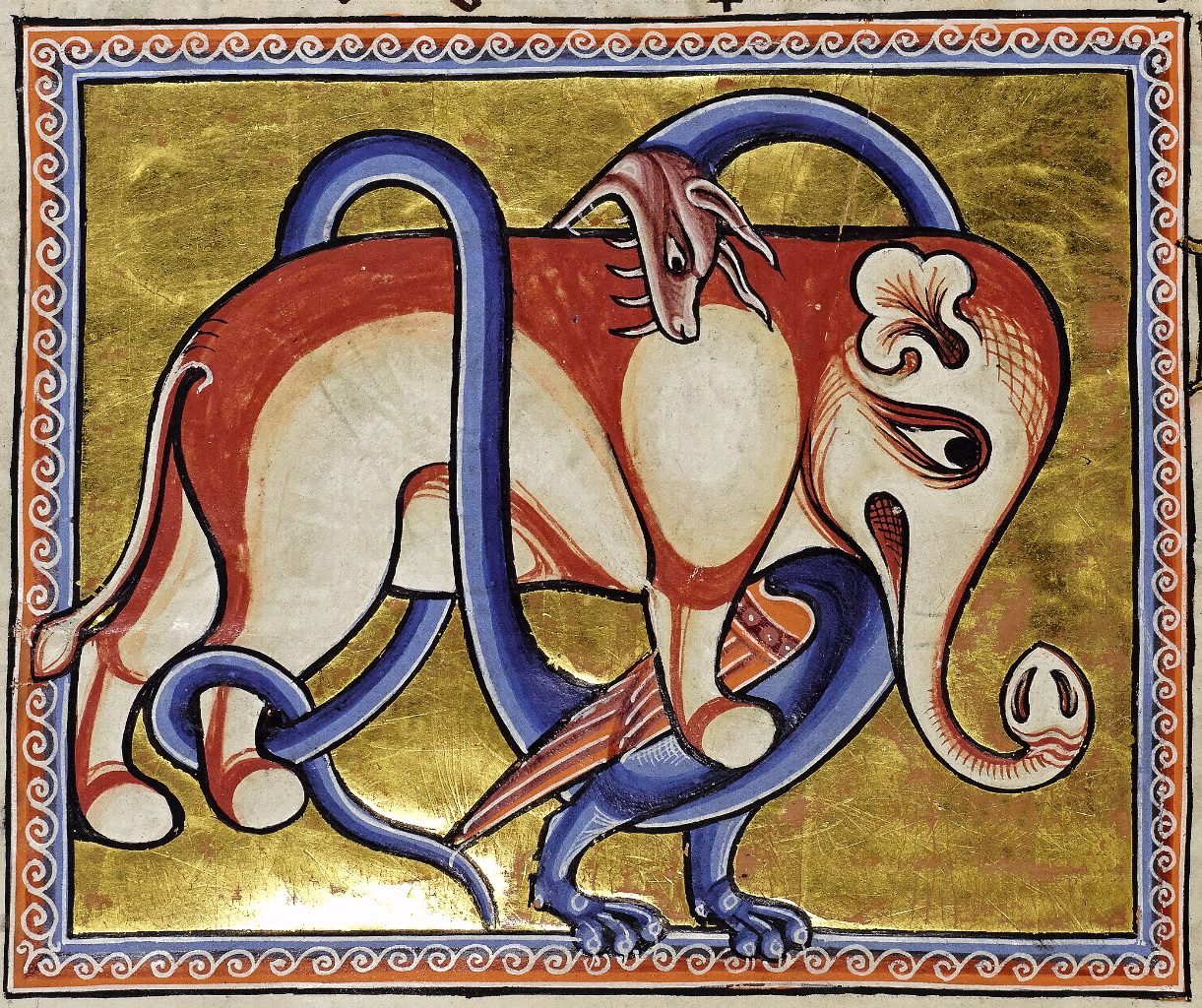
Folio 65 Verso - Dragon (detail)

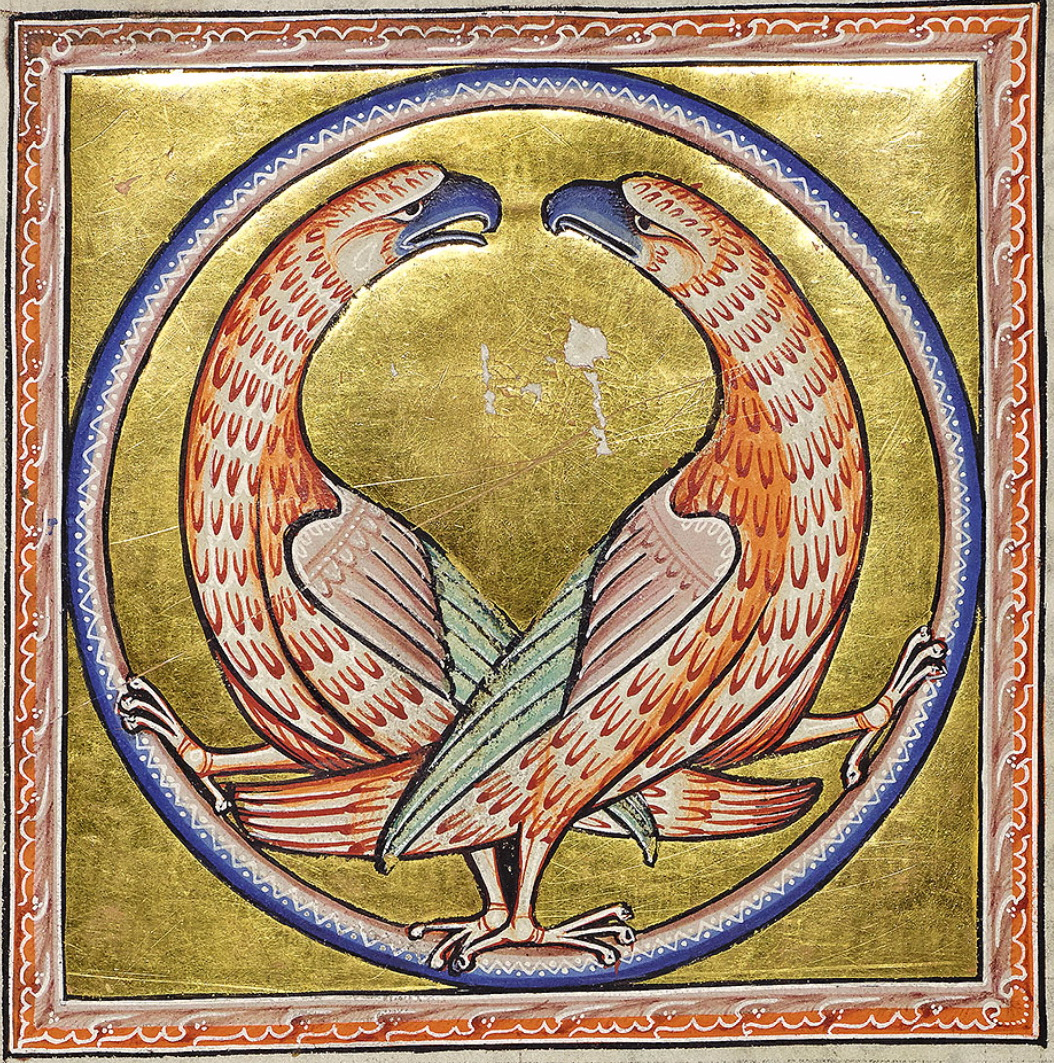
Folio 44 Recto - Vulture (detail)

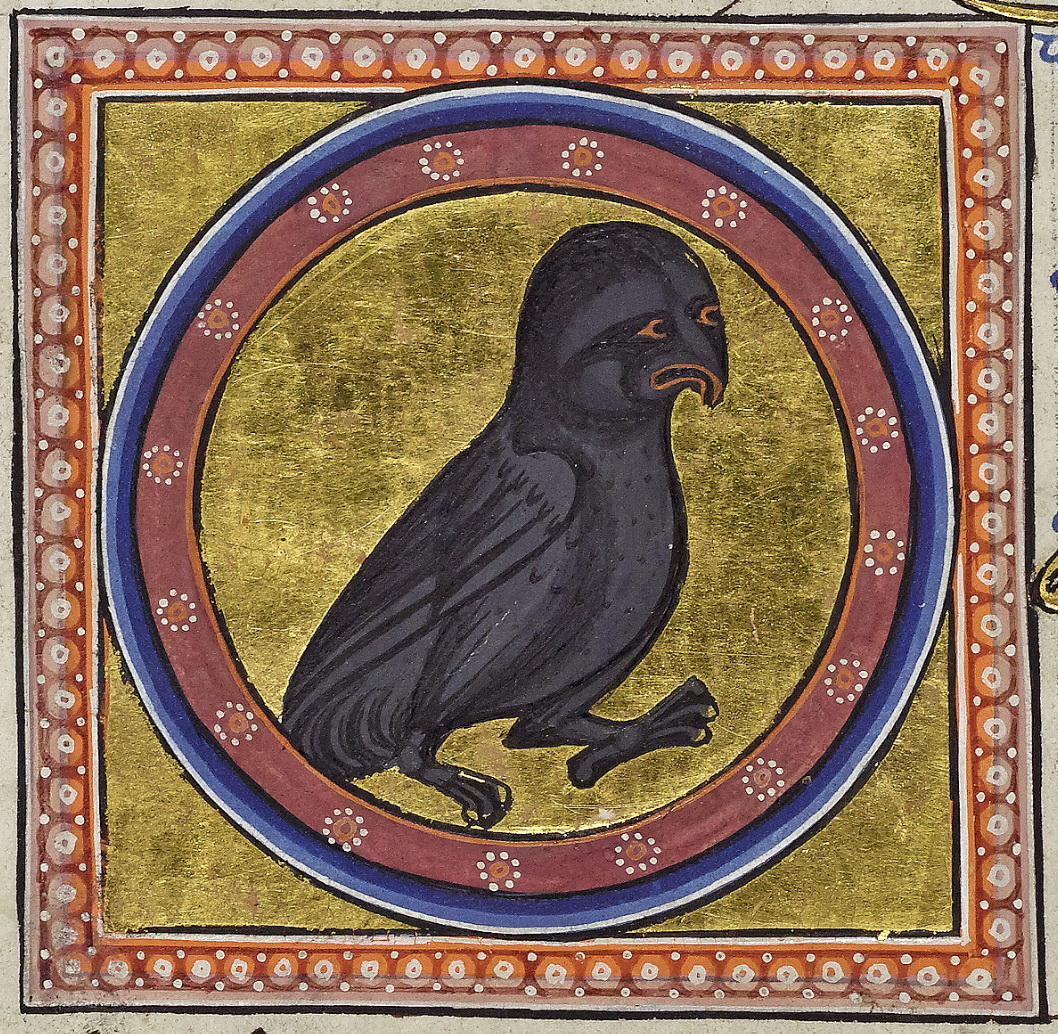
Folio 51 Recto - Little Owl (detail)

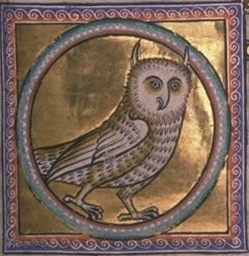
Folio 50 - Eagle Owl (detail)

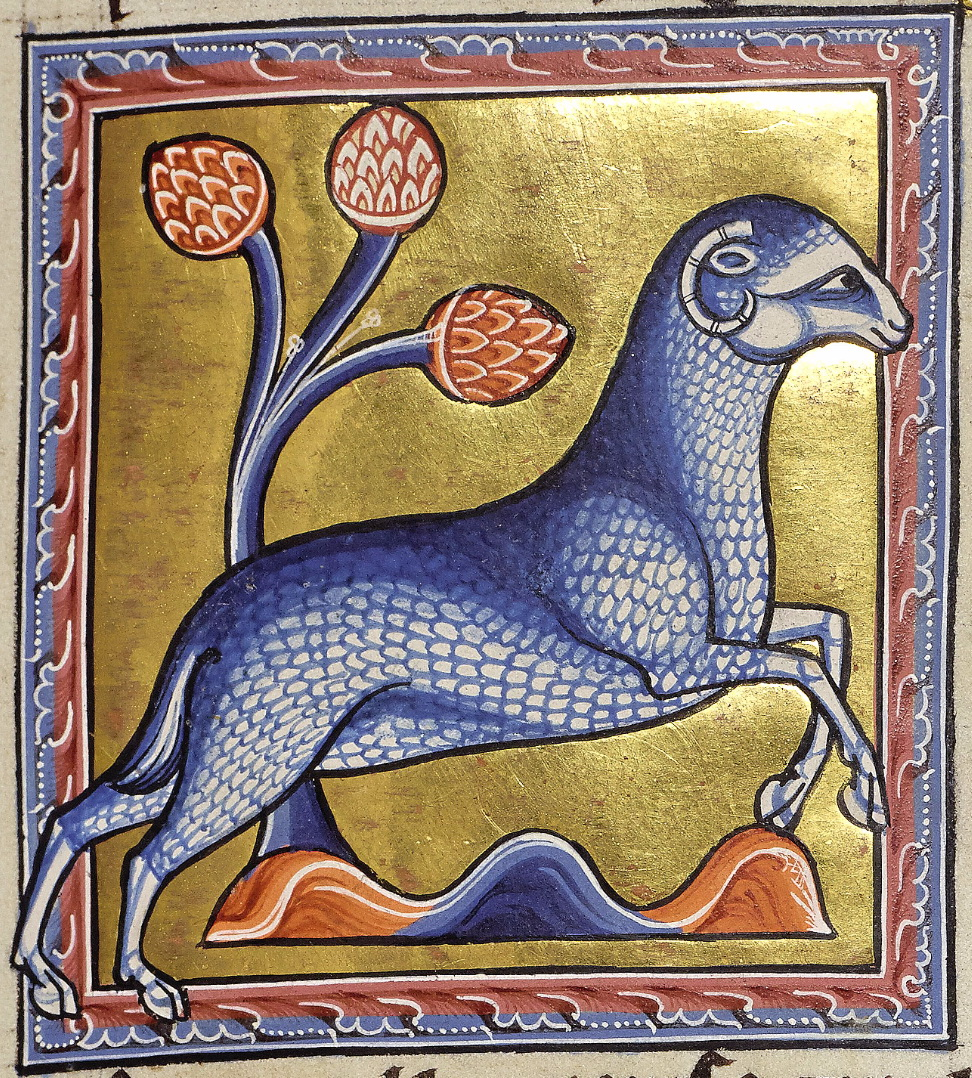
Folio 21 Recto - Ram/Aries (detail)

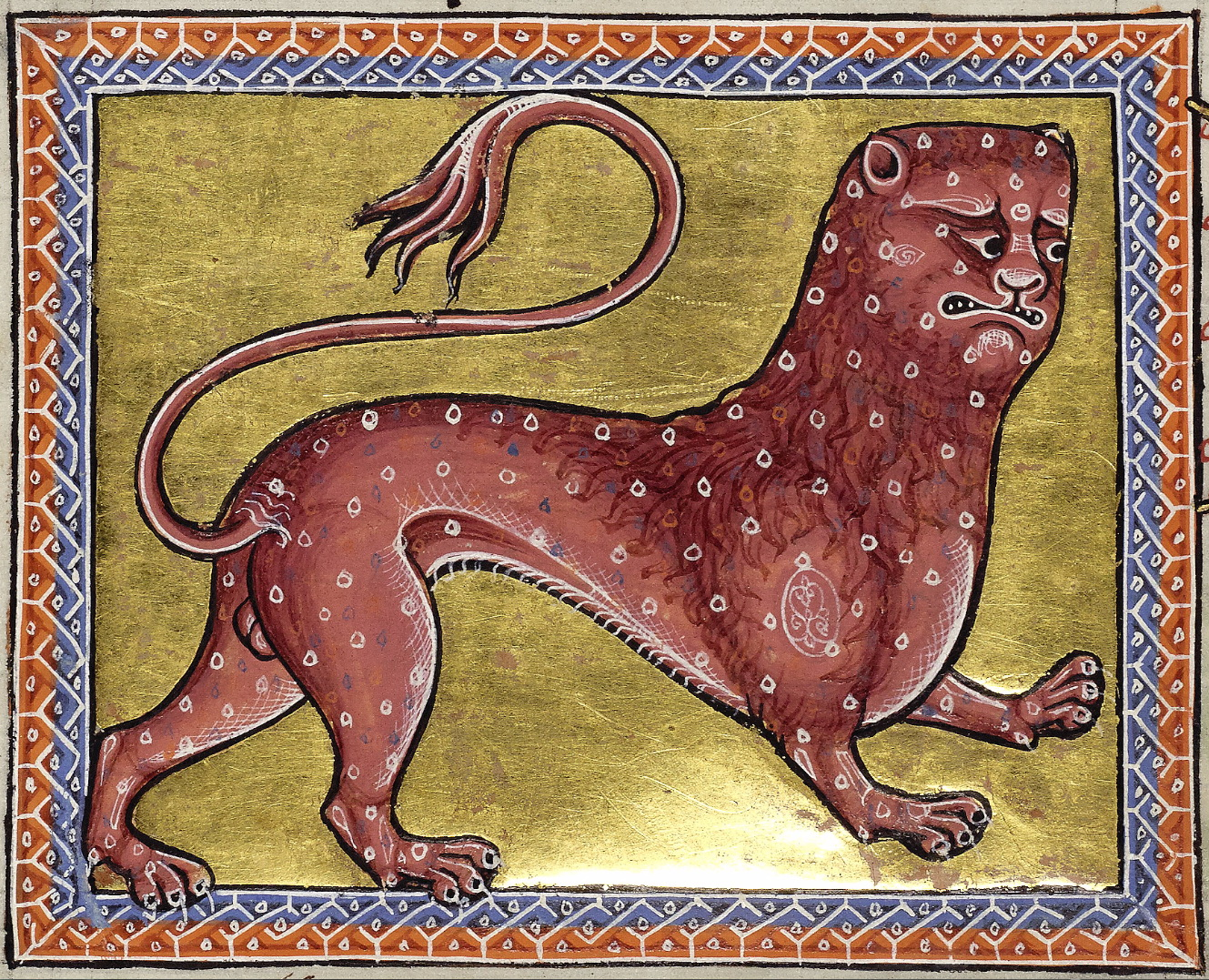
Folio 8 Verso - Leopard (detail)

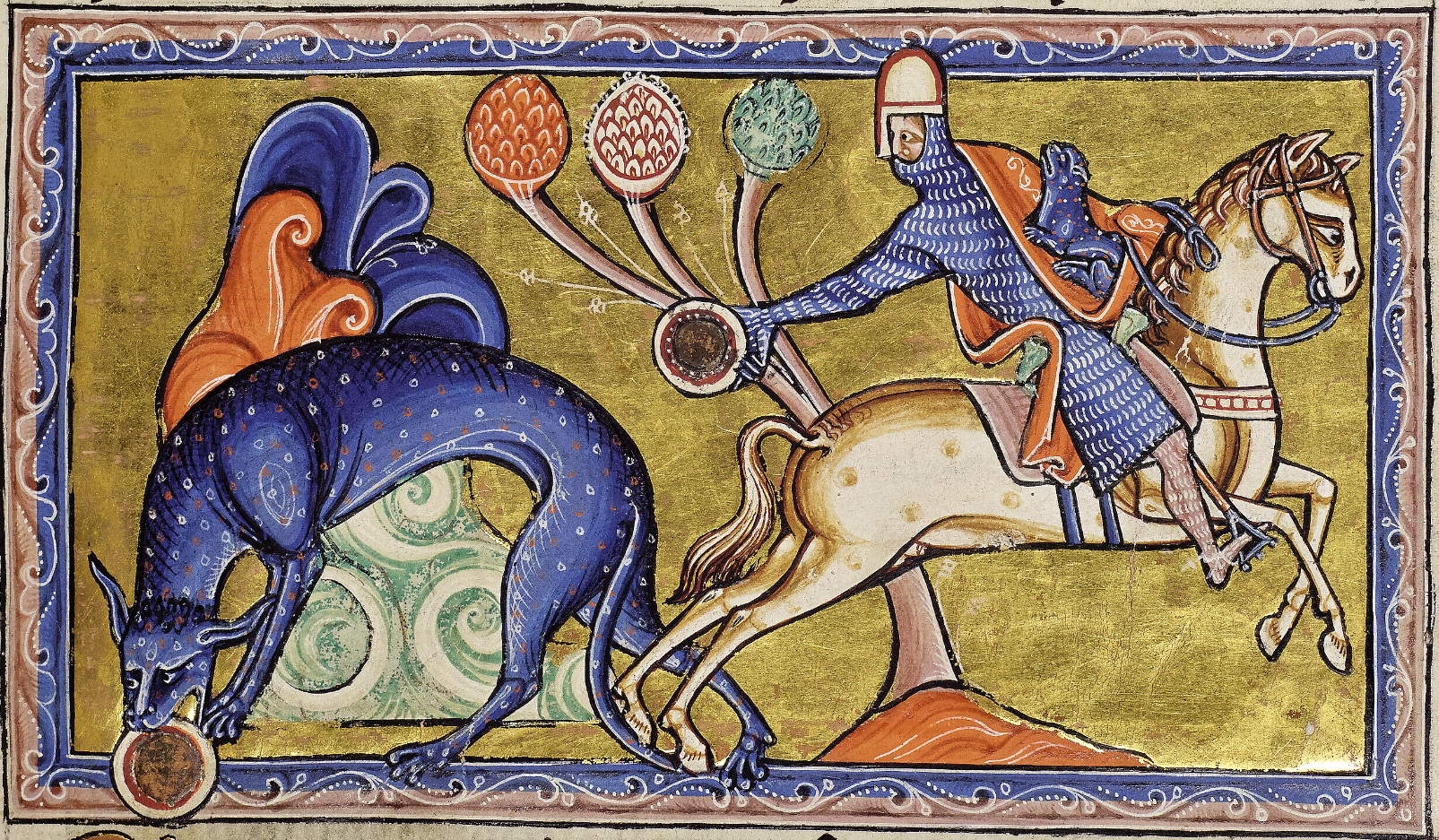
Folio 8 Recto - Tiger

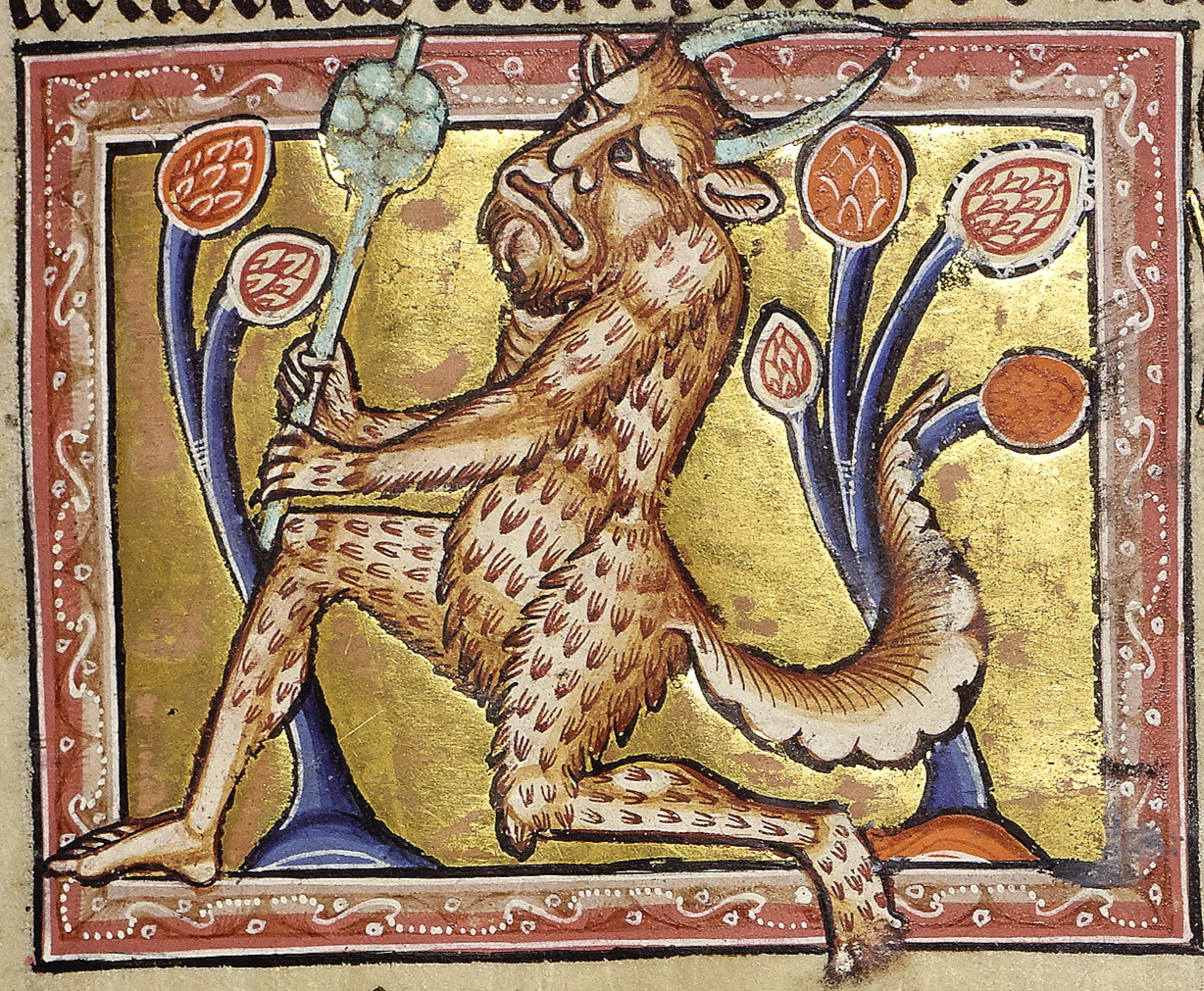
Folio 13 Recto - Satyr (detail)

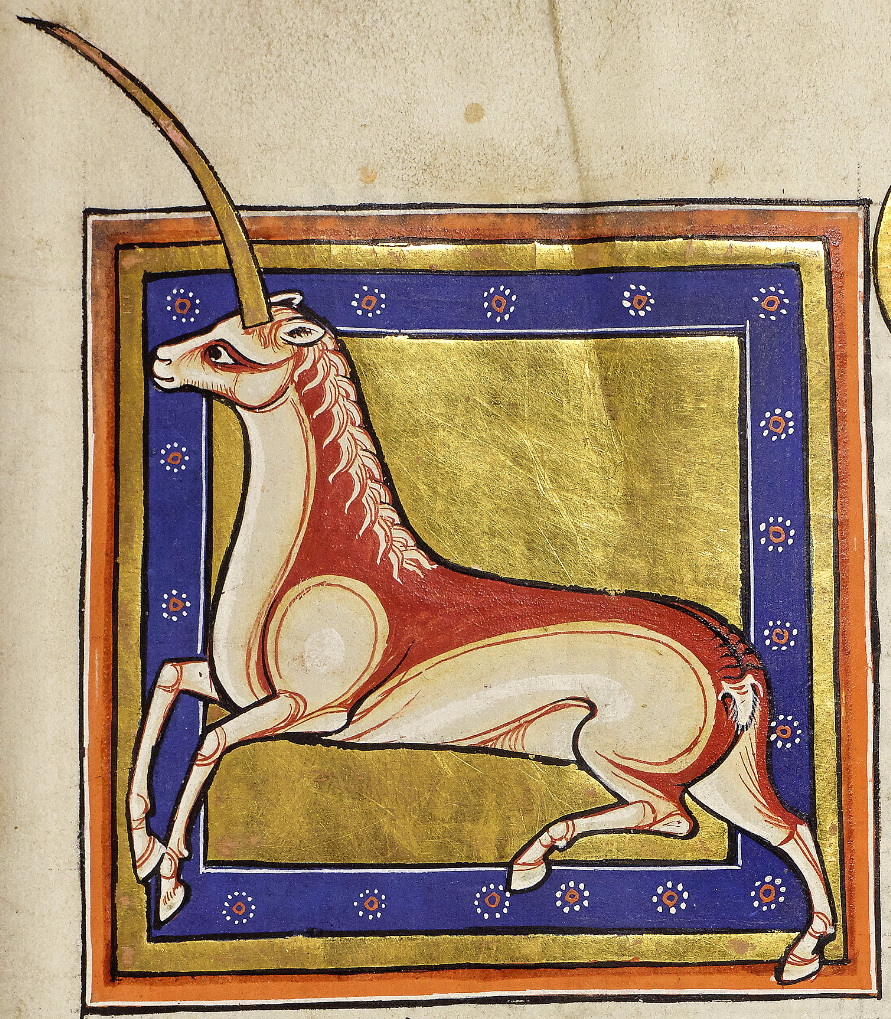
Folio 15 Recto - Monoceros (detail)

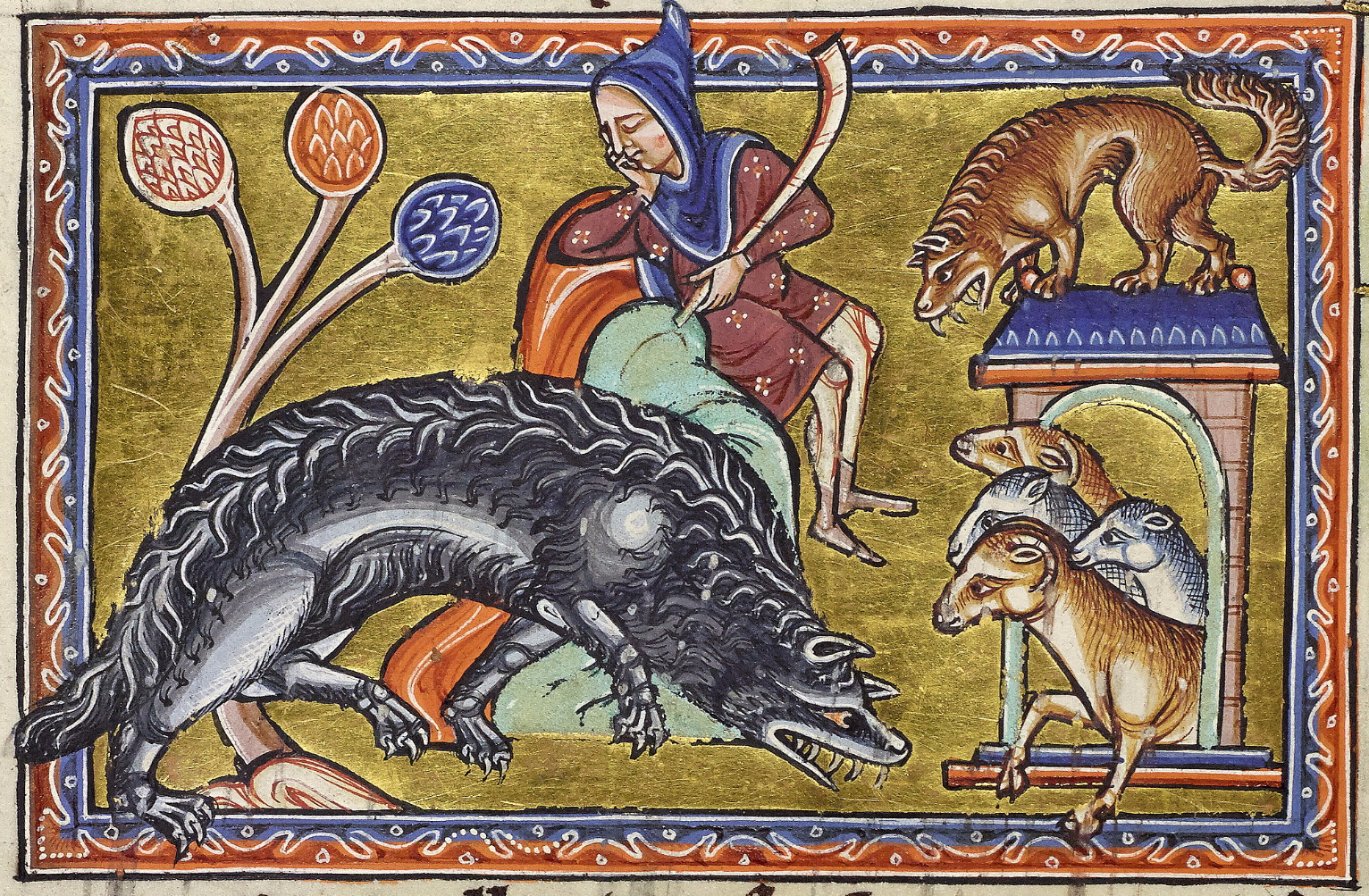
Folio 16 Verso - Wolf (detail)

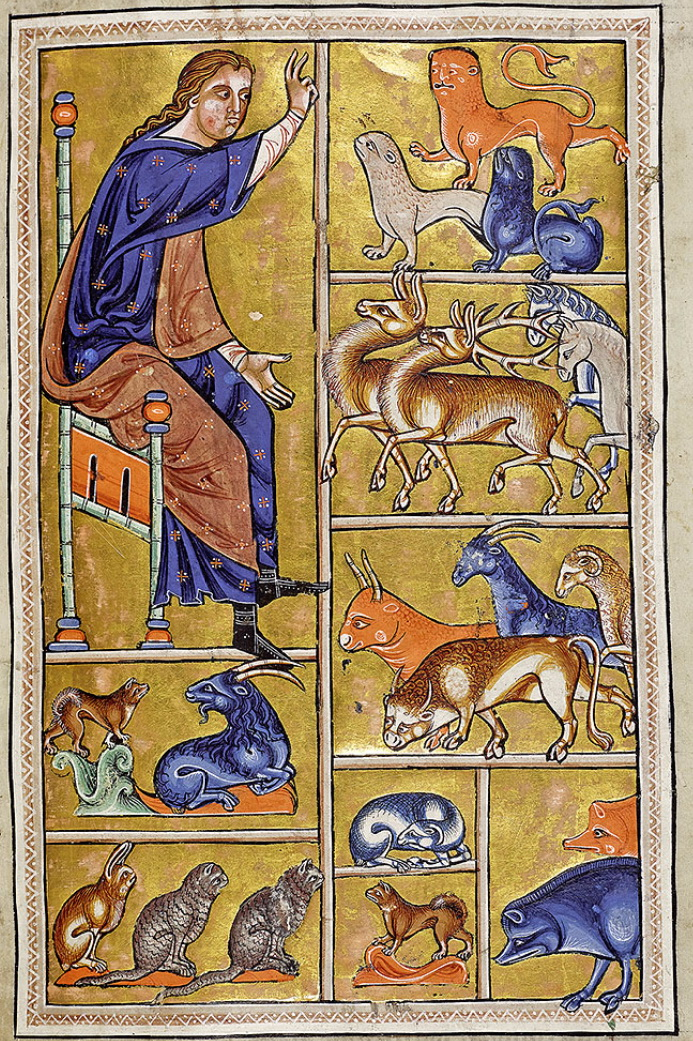
Folio 5 Recto - Adam (detail)

== See also ==
- Bestiary
- List of medieval bestiaries
- Physiologus
- Ashmole Bestiary
- Paris Psalter
- Aviarium
