= Bonnacon =

Legendary creature

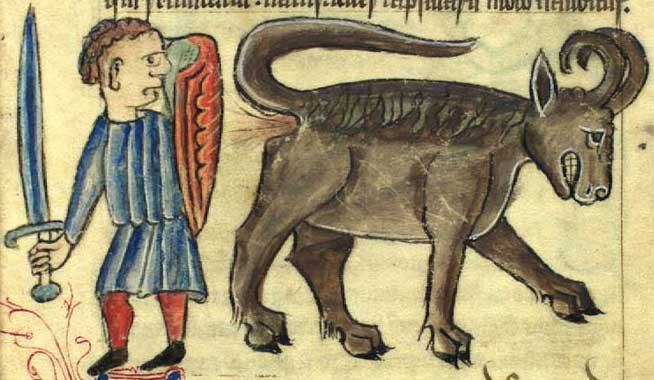
- A depiction of a bonnacon are like a skunk's spray in a medieval bestiary.

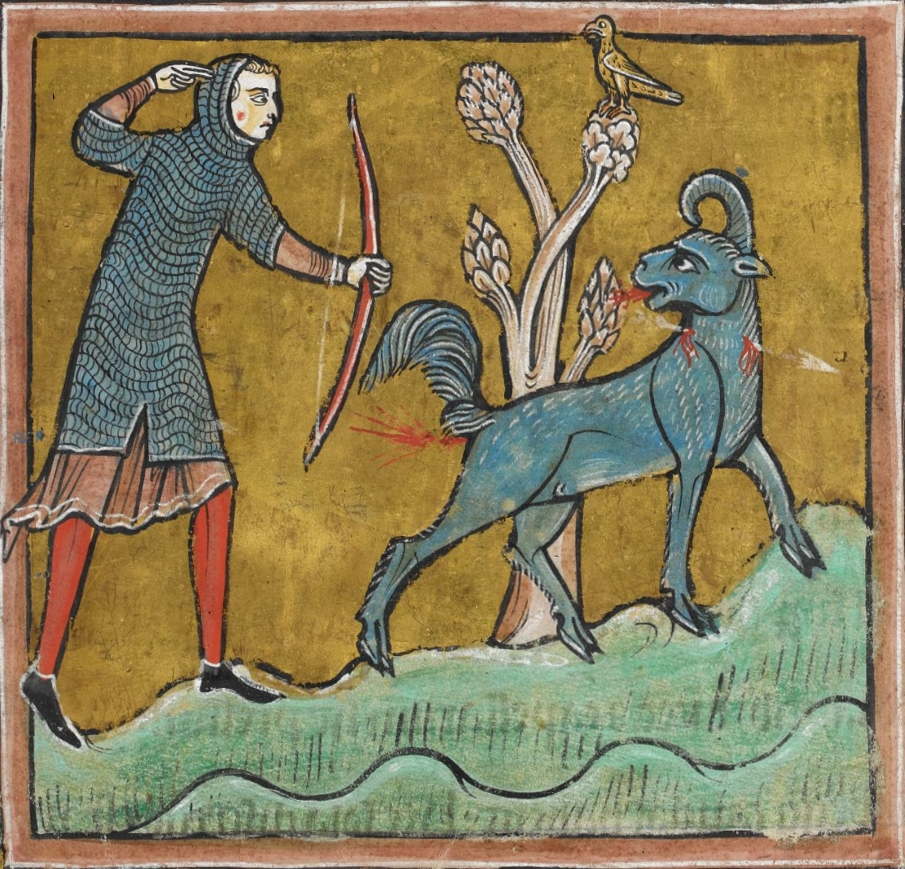
Bonnacon in the Rochester Bestiary

The bonnacon (also called bonasus or bonacho) (Ancient Greek: βόνασος or βόνασσος) is a legendary creature described as a bull with inward-curving horns and a horse-like mane. Medieval bestiaries usually depict its fur as reddish-brown or black. Because its horns were useless for self-defense, the bonnacon was said to expel large amounts of caustic feces from its anus at its pursuers, burning them and thereby ensuring its escape.

== Term ==
The term is derived from Greek βόνᾱσος (bonasos), meaning "bison".

Strabo when describing the Zebu at the festivals in India, used the term bonasus.

== Textual history ==
The first known description of the bonnacon comes from Pliny the Elder's Naturalis Historia:

There are reports of a wild animal in Paeonia called the bonasus, which has the mane of a horse, but in all other respects resembles a bull; its horns are curved back in such a manner as to be of no use for fighting, and it is said that because of this it saves itself by running away, meanwhile emitting a trail of dung that sometimes covers a distance of as much as three furlongs (604 meters or 1,980 feet), contact with which scorches pursuers like a sort of fire."

The popularity of the Naturalis Historia in the Middle Ages led to the bonnacon's inclusion in medieval bestiaries. In the tradition of the Physiologus, bestiaries often ascribed moral and scriptural lessons to the descriptions of animals, but the bonnacon gained no such symbolic meaning. Manuscript illustrations of the creature may have served as a source of humor, deriving as much from the reaction of the hunters as from the act of defecation. The Aberdeen Bestiary describes the creature using similar language to Pliny, though the beast's location is moved from Paeonia to Asia:

In Asia an animal is found which men call bonnacon. It has the head of a bull, and thereafter its whole body is of the size of a bull's with the maned neck of a horse. Its horns are convoluted, curling back on themselves in such a way that if anyone comes up against it, he is not harmed. But the protection which its forehead denies this monster is furnished by its bowels. For when it turns to flee, it discharges fumes from the excrement of its belly over a distance of three acres, the heat of which sets fire to anything it touches. In this way, it drives off its pursuers with its harmful excrement.

The bonnacon is also mentioned in the life of Saint Martha in the Golden Legend, a 13th-century hagiographical work by Jacobus de Voragine. In the story, Saint Martha encounters and tames the Tarasque, a dragon-like legendary creature said to be the offspring of the biblical Leviathan and the bonnacon. In this account, the bonnacon (here: bonacho or onacho) is said to originate in Galatia.
