= Seps (legendary creature) =

Mythological snake

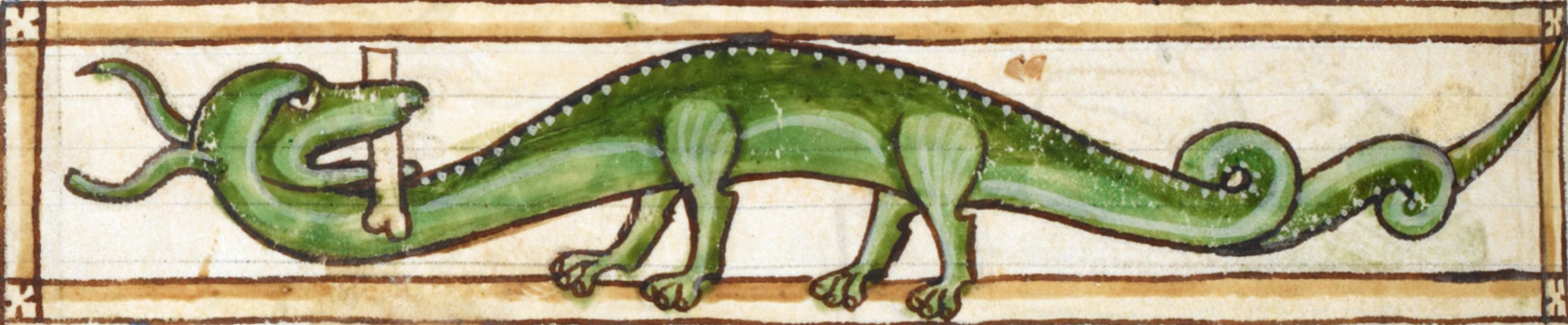
Seps (Bestiary Harley MS 3244, ff 36r-71v, 13th century, British Library).

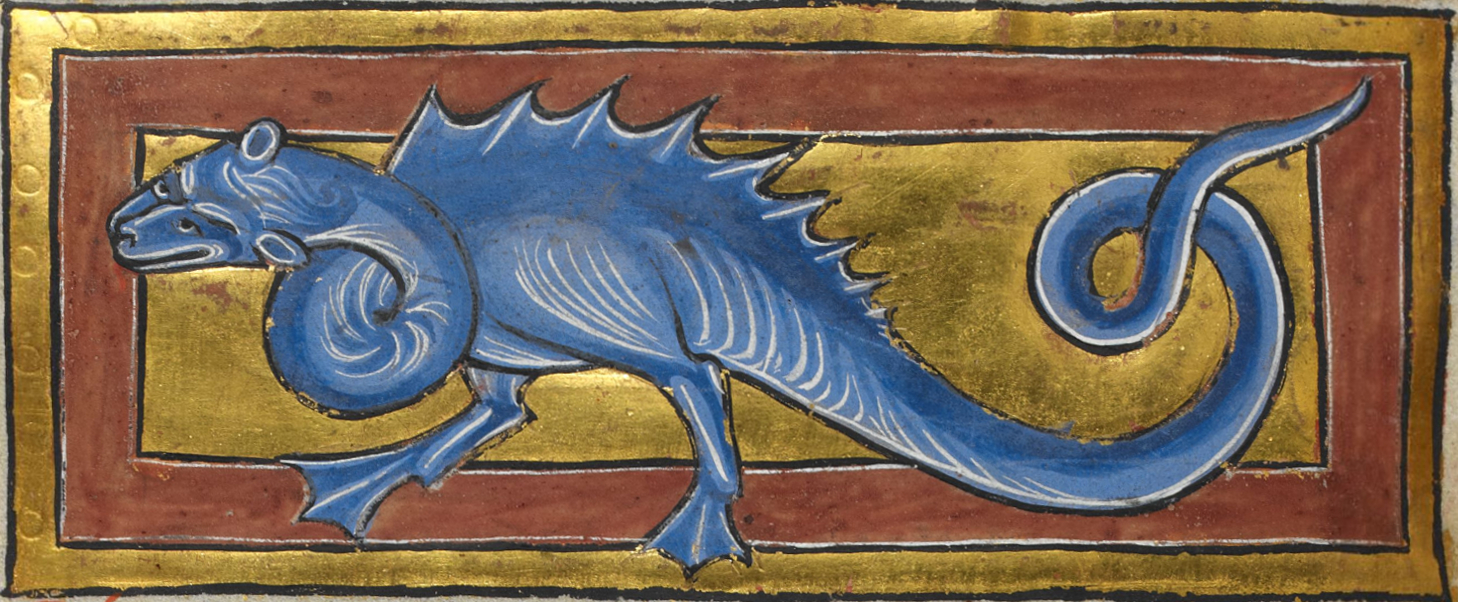
Seps (Royal Bestiary MS 12 C XIX; 1200-1210).

A seps is a legendary snake from medieval bestiaries. They were said to have extremely corrosive venom that liquefied their prey.

Lucan's Pharsalia refers to its appearance and the effects of its poison.

... Clinging to his skin
A Seps with curving tooth, of little size,
He seized and tore away, and to the sands
Pierced with his javelin. Small the serpent's bulk;
None deals a death more horrible in form.
For swift the flesh dissolving round the wound
Bared the pale bone; swam all his limbs in blood;
Wasted the tissue of his calves and knees:
And all the muscles of his thighs were thawed
In black distilment, and file membrane sheath
Parted, that bound his vitals, which abroad
Flowed upon earth: yet seemed it not that all
His frame was loosed, for by the venomous drop
Were all the bands that held his muscles drawn
Down to a juice; the framework of his chest
Was bare, its cavity, and all the parts
Hid by the organs of life, that make the man.

Shelley in Prometheus Unbound writes:

...all my being,
Like him whom the Numidian seps did thaw
Into a dew with poison, is dissolved...

Similarly, the seps is described as "a small snake which consumes with its poison not just the body but the bones" in the medieval Aberdeen Bestiary.

== See also ==
- Tetradactylus seps
- Chalcides sepsoides
