= Scitalis =

Creature in Medieval bestiaries

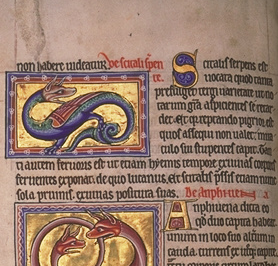
Scitalis in the Aberdeen Bestiary, folio 68v.

The Scitalis or Scytale is a serpent from Medieval bestiaries, such as the Aberdeen Bestiary, supposed to have such marvelous markings on its back that its appearance would stun the viewer, slowing the person down so that they could be caught. Its bodily heat was so great that it shed its skin even in the winter.

Lucan wrote in the 1st century AD, in his Pharsalia, book 9, verse 841-842, that "Sole of all serpents Scytale to shed / In vernal frosts his slough...".

Isidore of Seville wrote in the 7th century AD in his Etymologiae Book 12, 4:19, that "The scitalis (scytale) has a skin that shines with such variety that by these marks it slows down any who see it. It creeps slowly and cannot pursue its prey, so it stupifies with its marvelous appearance. It is so hot that even in winter it sheds its skin."
