= Ashmole Bestiary =

12–13th century English illuminated manuscript

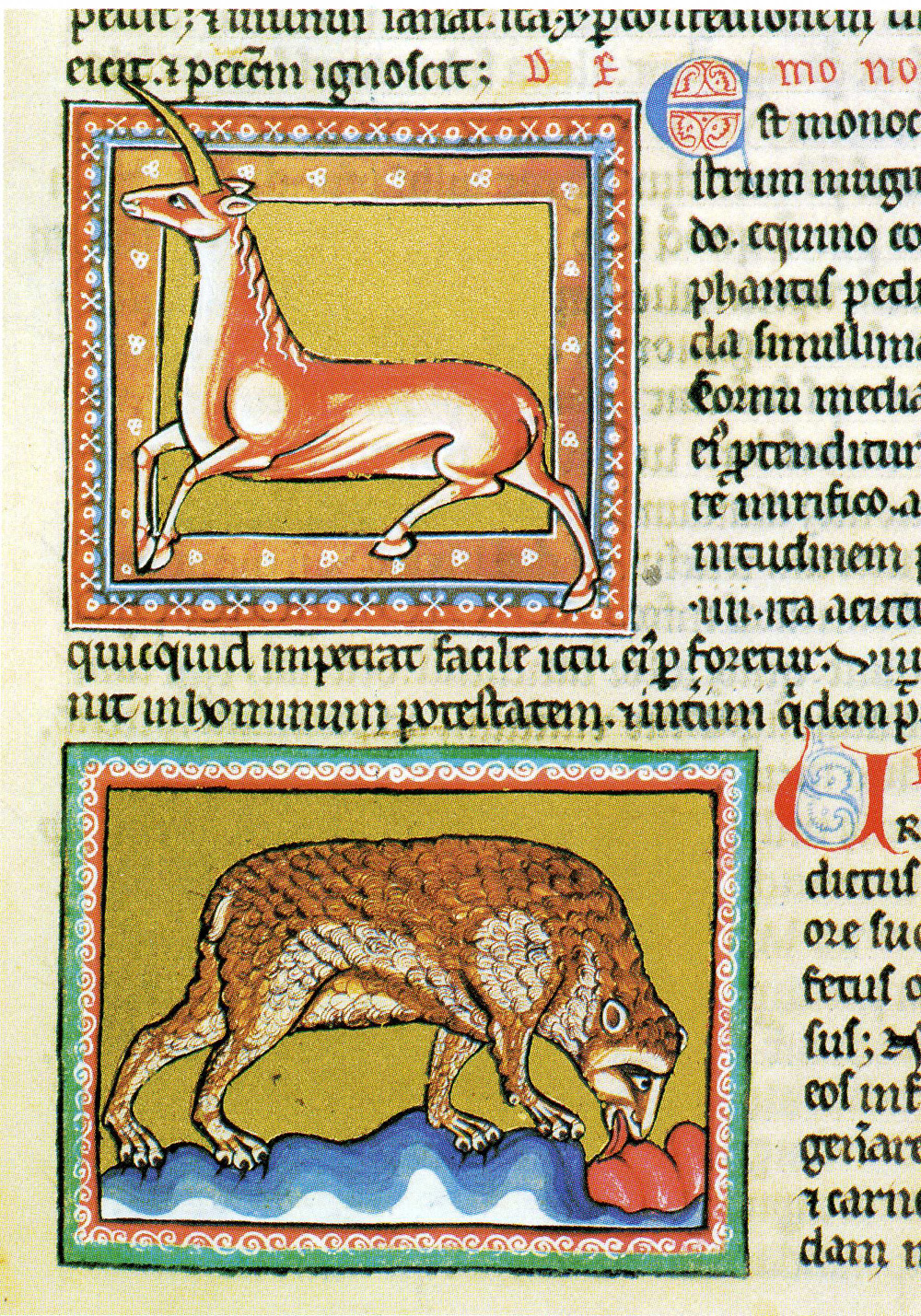
Ashmole Bestiary; folio 21r: Monoceros and bear

The Ashmole Bestiary, an English illuminated manuscript bestiary, is from the late 12th or early 13th century. Under 90 such manuscripts survive and they were studied and categorized into families by M.R. James in 1928. The Ashmole Bestiary is part of the Second-family of manuscript Latin bestiaries, wherein it is one of forty eight. The "Second-family" bestiary is the most popular and widely distributed type of these manuscripts. It is of English origin, with a spiritual text that catered to the prevailing culture of the church at the time. The stimulating illuminations are not just decorative, as many people were illiterate or semi-literate in England at the time. All true Latin Bestiaries take their origin from the Greek work Physiologus, though the word can colloquially be used with less specificity.

== Content ==
Bestiaries are not intended to be zoological books, as a result the Ashmole Bestiary is not biologically consistent or scientifically accurate. These are artefacts of the Catholic Church and are meant to teach Christian principles and promote Christian values through the use allegory and symbolism in nature. Instead of being naturalist documentation, bestiaries are meant to tell the tale of Christ's work and teachings using the symbolism of various animals as part of the allegory. The animal-related stories in the manuscript contain moral themes and convey ideas of Christian ethics.

Like almost all bestiaries, the Ashmole Bestiary contains a creation story from the book of Genesis, about God creating man and animals before the detailed allegorical descriptions of the 130 animals written in Latin.

Content from Hugh of Fouilloy's sixty chapter De avibus which was written between 1132 and 1152 is incorporated into the text with 29 full colour illustrations. The text is known by other names including like The Aviarium (The Aviary), De columba deargentata (The Silvered Dove), and De tribus columbis (The three Doves) but all refer to the same work.

=== Writing ===
The first few pages were originally left blank when the manuscript was initially created. As it came under new ownership throughout the centuries, some additions were made. An example of this is on the first page, which reads "ex libris of Peter Manwood" and has a drawing of a building done in graphite. This addition indicating the owner at the time was made some 300 years after the manuscript's creation.

Scholars believe that way the manuscript is written and the tone and ideas conveyed within it suggest that it was intended to be used in an instructional manner, to teach the lessons of Christianity through the metaphors of the natural world. It does not delve into complex ideas and maintains a straightforward presentation throughout, likely to aid its ease of understanding.

=== Illuminations ===
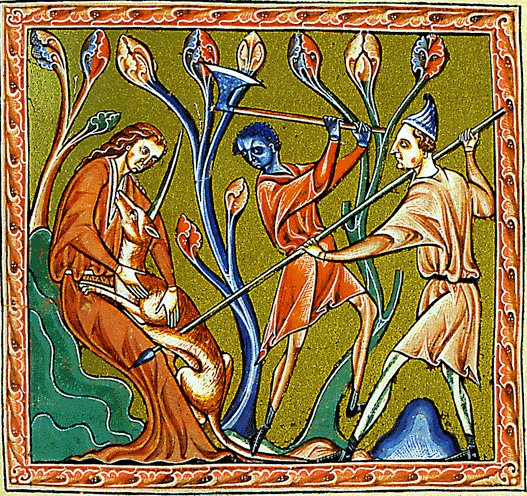
The Ashmole Bestiary, folio 14 verso: Unicornis, early 13th century

Rich colour miniatures of the animals of the compendium are a key part of the medieval bestiary, and what captivates many historians and preservationists. In keeping with this tradition The Ashmole Bestiary features “real” animals (such as dogs, beavers, and elephants), but also mythical and legendary creatures like a unicorn and a phoenix. Some of the more common or known animals may still have fantastical elements ascribed to them, like a snake having wings, a dog who can detect lies, or fledgling pelicans coming back to life. These fantastical elements serve to further to the goal of conveying morals and Christian teachings.

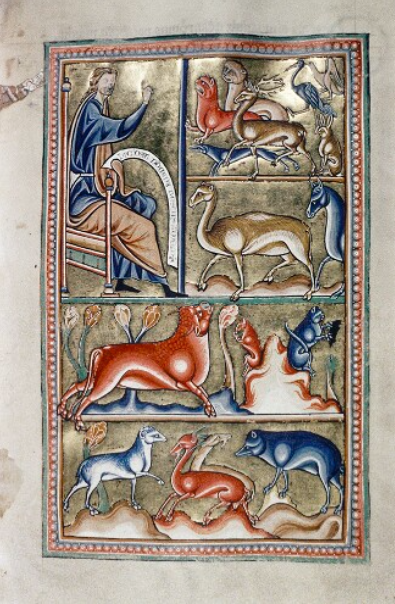
Medieval Ashmole Bestiary illumination of the biblical Adam Naming the creatures of earth

The introductory pages include a colorful miniature of Adam Naming the Animals that takes up an entire page by itself. This lavish inclusion is from the biblical book of Genesis from the quote "The man gave names to all the cattle, all the birds of heaven and all the wild animals." Most, if not all medieval bestiaries contain the story of the Christian Creation Myth, and many extant examples of medieval bestiaries are incomplete, which is one reason why the Ashmole manuscript is so remarkable and well studied.

The Ashmole Bestiary has been reproduced as a facsimile in both French and German but not yet in English. There is a full digital facsimile available through the Bodleian library digital records.

== History ==
The Ashmole Bestiary (Bodleian Library MS. Ashmole 1511) along with its sister manuscript the Aberdeen Bestiary, is a late 12th or early 13th century English illuminated manuscript Bestiary. Both are of the Second Family of Bestiary Manuscripts. The two manuscripts are often compared to each other due to their striking similarities in illustration and the close time in which they were both made. Though there is still some debate among medieval scholars about which one is older and therefore the original, the similarities are significant to the point that there is a scholarly consensus that both manuscripts share an origin. The famed medievalist scholar M. R. James considered the Aberdeen Bestiary to likely be a replica of Ashmole based on the quality of the illuminations and artistic style of both artefacts.

=== Provenance ===
It is unclear to historians and researchers who the original patron; they may have been an aristocrat, a high-ranking member of the church, or a monastery. It has been suggested by experts that the inclusion of Hugh of Fouilloy De avibus suggests a monastic origin for the work.

It is known through the study of the physical document and the inscriptions there-in that in the mid-1500s the Ashmole Bestiary belonged to William Wright, the vicar of Chipping Wycombe . After which the manuscript was in the possession of William Man, esq., of Canterbury, who gave it as a gift to Peter Manwood, who was an antiquary, in 1609. The next historically verifiable home of the manuscript was in the museum of John Tradescant, the elder, who then passed it on to his son John Tradescant the younger. Later that century antiquarian, and namesake of the artifact, Elias Ashmole would come into possession of it. Ashmole's collection of antiques, curiosities and books was donated after his death, founding the Ashmolean Museum. In 1860 the manuscript was transferred to the Bodleian Library which is one of the oldest libraries in Europe and one of the largest in England. It has resided there ever since.

To protect the manuscript from damage, that can be caused by even the most careful handling, access to the artefact is restricted. Manuscript preservation requires stringent rules. Researchers are asked to use replicas and published descriptions as much as is practicable.

=== Condition ===
While the bestiary is in excellent condition considering it is centuries old, it does contain some flaws. Aside from the wear of time it has edits and corrections by the different people who owned it throughout the centuries. There was an attempt at re-binding the manuscript sometime in the 17th century. Centuries later in 1987 the Ashmole Bestiary was restored and rebound, removing the previous re-binding. Using modern technology, plain alum-tawed calfskin, and correcting some of the damaging preservation attempts from the 17th century. The 17th century binding is still kept with the manuscript in the library.
