= Legendary creature =

Supernatural animal

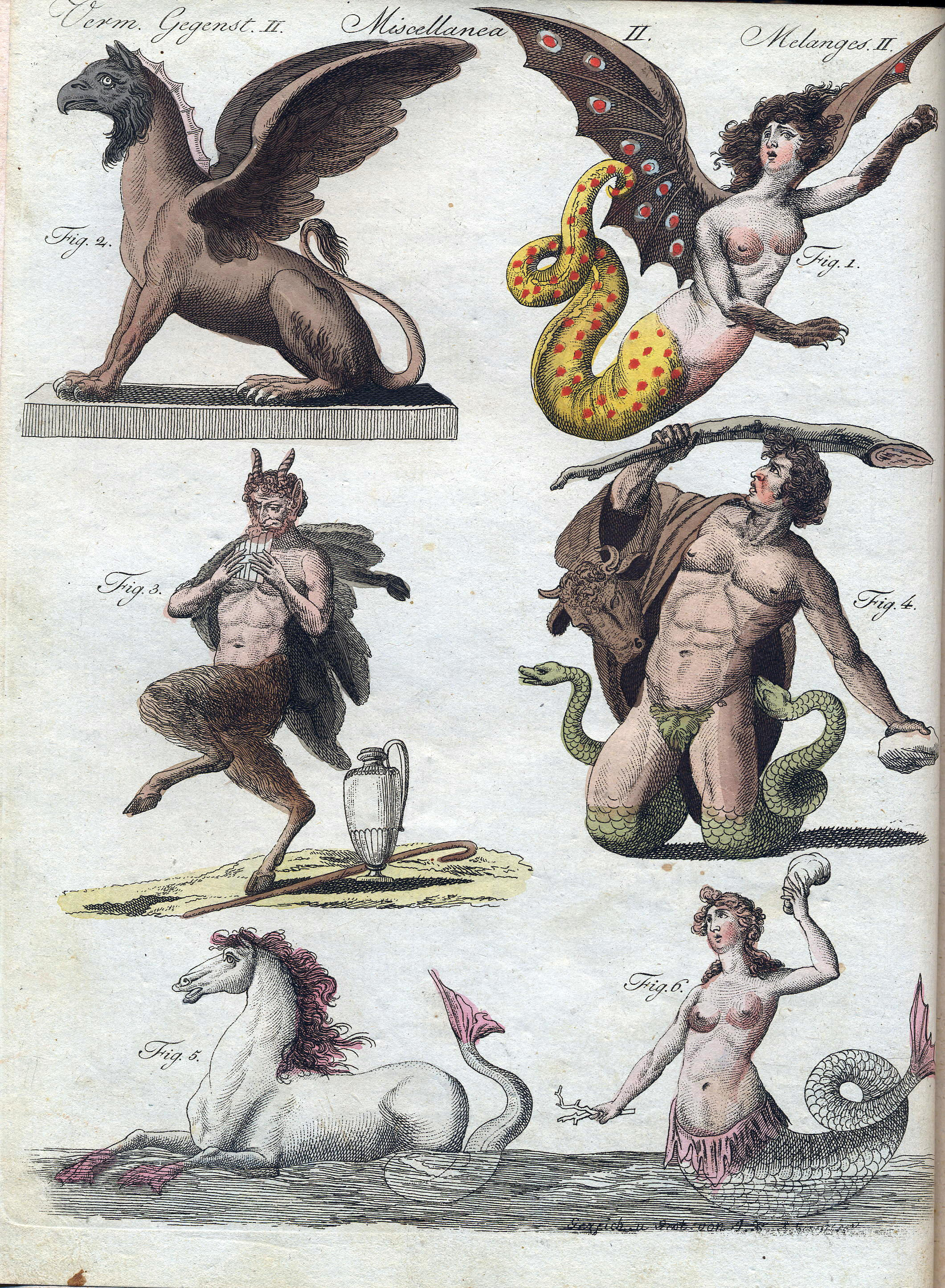
Several legendary creatures from Bilderbuch für Kinder (lit. 'picture book for children') between 1790 and 1822, by Friedrich Justin Bertuch

A legendary creature is a type of supernatural entity that is described in folklore (including myths and legends), and may be featured in historical accounts before modernity, but has not been scientifically shown to exist. In the classical era, monstrous creatures such as the Cyclops and the Minotaur appear in heroic tales for the protagonist to destroy. Other creatures, such as the unicorn, were claimed in accounts of natural history by various scholars of antiquity. Some legendary creatures are hybrid beasts or Chimeras.

Some legendary creatures originated in traditional mythology and were believed to be real creatures—for example, dragons, griffins and unicorns. Others are based on real encounters or garbled accounts of travellers' tales, such as the Vegetable Lamb of Tartary, a sheep-like animal which supposedly grew tethered to the earth.

== Creatures ==
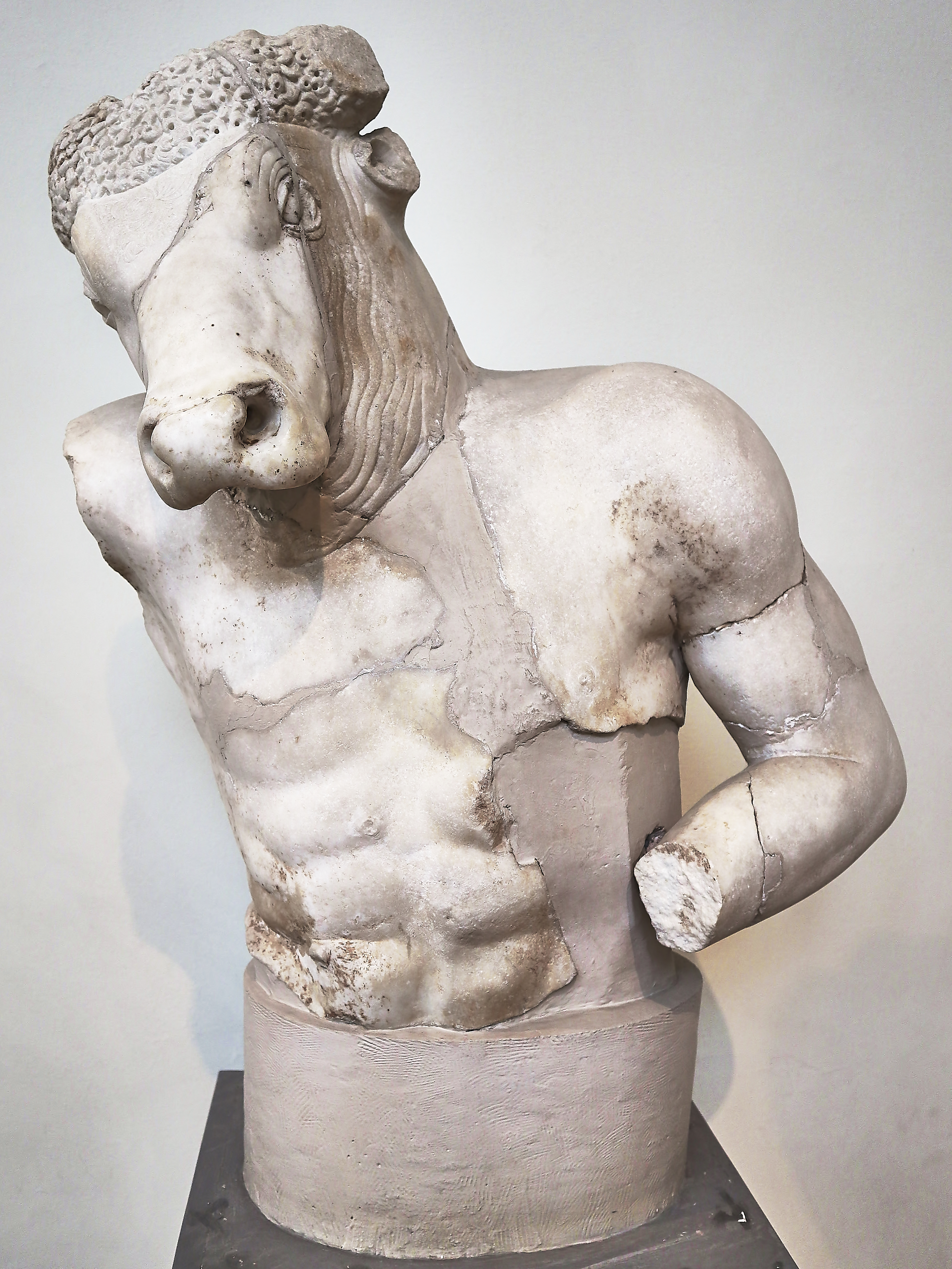
In classical mythology, the Minotaur was defeated by the hero Theseus.

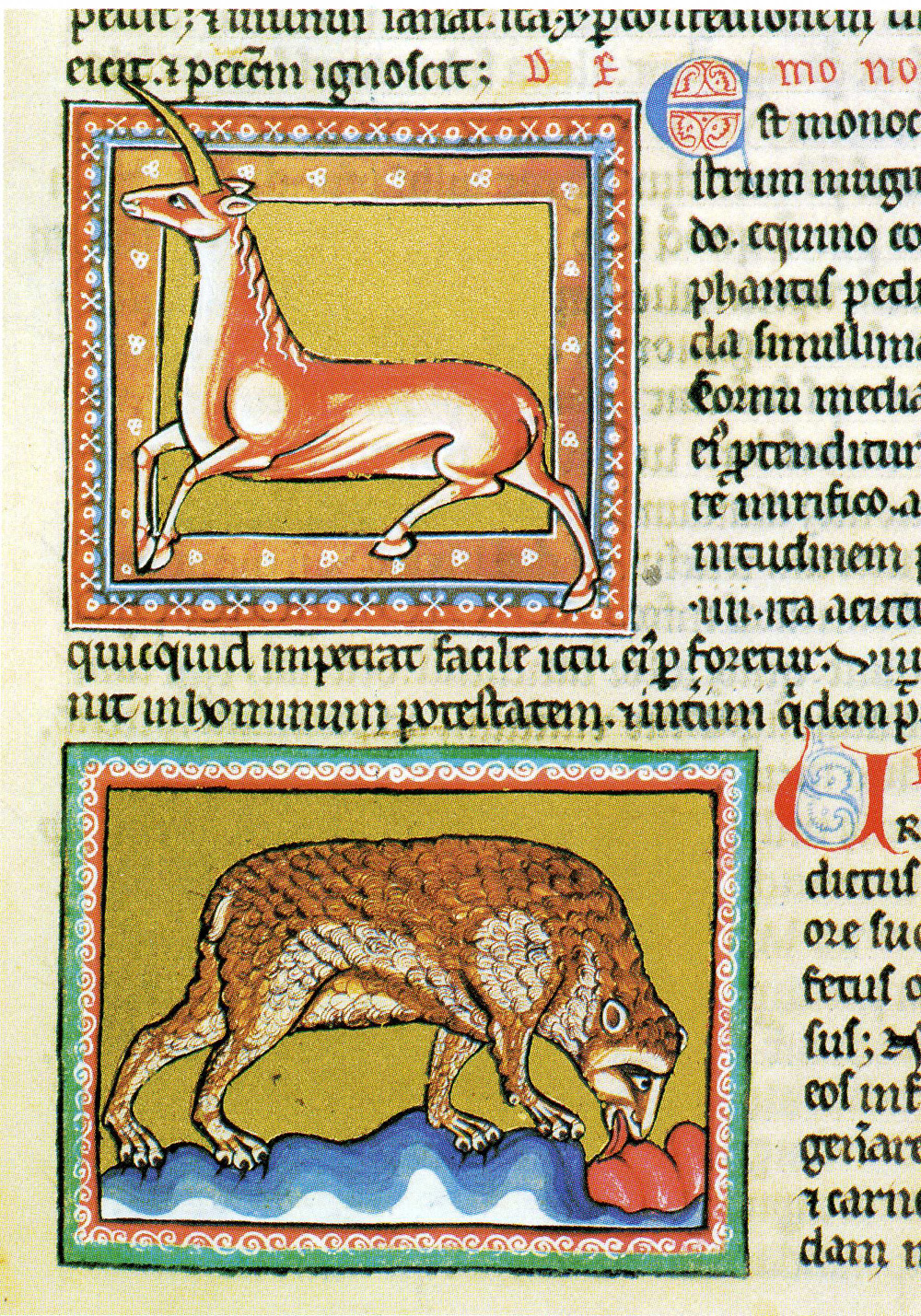
Medieval bestiaries included mythical animals like the monoceros (above) alongside real animals like the bear.

A variety of mythical animals appear in the art and stories of the classical era. For example, in the Odyssey, monstrous creatures include the Cyclops, Scylla and Charybdis for the hero Odysseus to confront. Other tales include Medusa to be defeated by Perseus, the (human/bull) Minotaur to be destroyed by Theseus, and the Hydra to be killed by Heracles, while Aeneas battles with the harpies. These monsters thus have the basic function of emphasizing the greatness of the heroes involved.

Some classical era creatures, such as the (horse/human) centaur, chimaera, Triton and the flying horse Pegasus, are also found in Indian art. Similarly, sphinxes appear as winged lions in Indian art and the Piasa Bird of North America. In medieval art, animals, both real and mythical, played important roles. These included decorative forms as in medieval jewellery, sometimes with their limbs intricately interlaced. Animal forms were used to add humor or majesty to objects. In Christian art, animals carried symbolic meanings, where, for example, the lamb symbolized Christ, a dove indicated the Holy Spirit, and the classical griffin represented a guardian of the dead. Medieval bestiaries included animals regardless of biological reality; the basilisk represented the devil, while the manticore symbolised temptation.

== Allegory ==
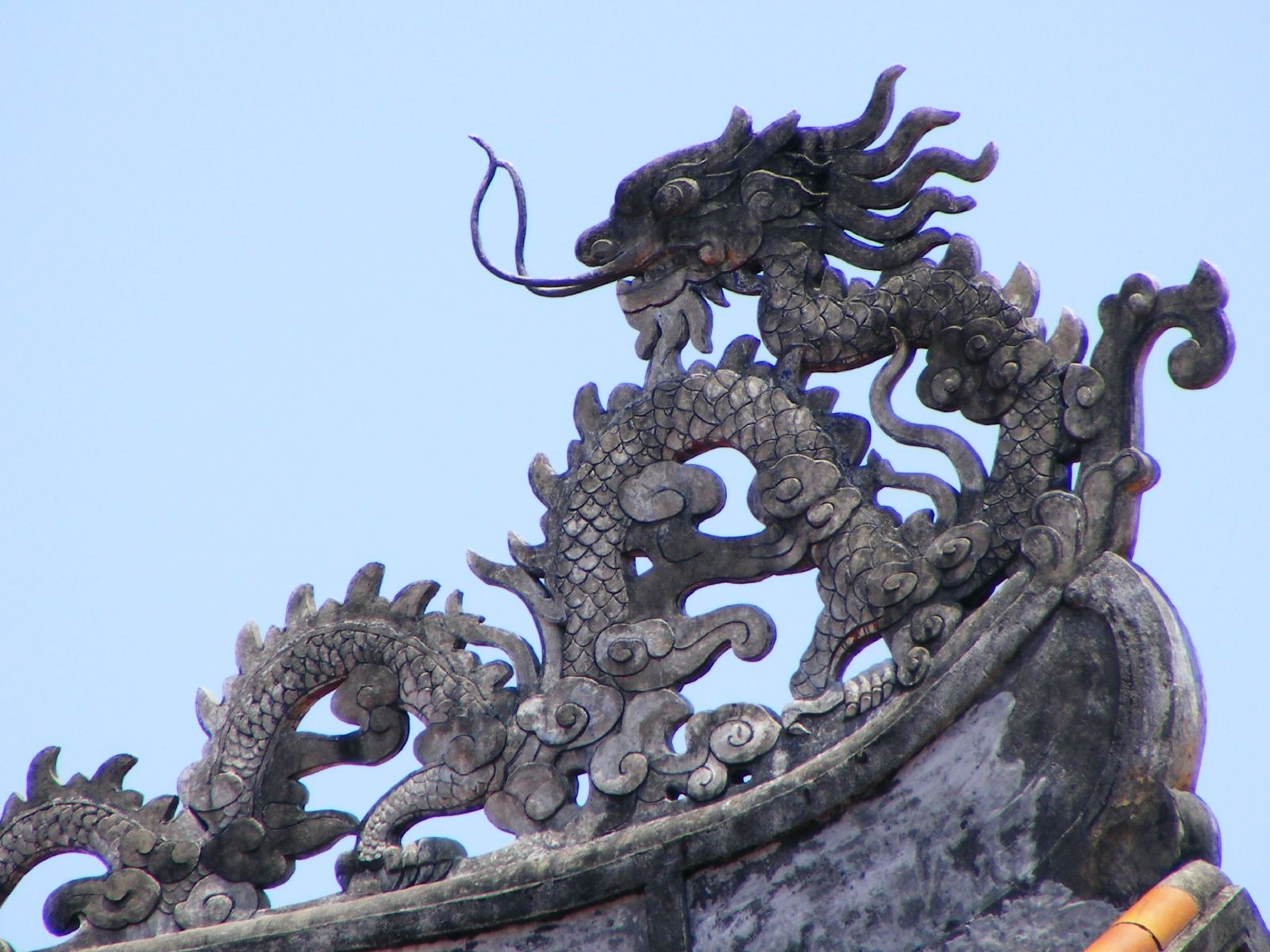
Symbolic power: a dragon in the Imperial City, Huế, Vietnam

One function of mythical animals in the Middle Ages was allegory. Unicorns, for example, were described as extraordinarily swift and uncatchable by traditional methods. It was believed that the only way for one to catch this beast was to lead a virgin to its dwelling. Then, the unicorn was supposed to leap into her lap and go to sleep, at which point a hunter could finally capture it. In terms of symbolism, the unicorn was a metaphor for Christ. Unicorns represented the idea of innocence and purity. In the King James Bible, Psalm 92:10 states, "My horn shalt thou exalt like the horn of a unicorn." This is because the translators of the King James erroneously translated the Hebrew word re'em as unicorn. Later versions translate this as wild ox. The unicorn's small size signifies the humility of Christ.

Another common legendary creature that served allegorical functions within the Middle Ages was the dragon. Dragons were identified with serpents, though their attributes were greatly intensified. The dragon was supposed to have been larger than all other animals. It was believed that the dragon had no harmful poison but was able to slay anything it embraced without any need for venom. Biblical scriptures speak of the dragon in reference to the devil, and they were used to denote sin in general during the Middle Ages. Dragons were said to have dwelled in places like Ethiopia and India, based on the idea that there was always heat present in these locations.

Physical detail was not the central focus of the artists depicting such animals, and medieval bestiaries were not conceived as biological categorizations. Creatures like the unicorn and griffin were not categorized in a separate "mythological" section in medieval bestiaries, as the symbolic implications were of primary importance. Animals we know to have existed were still presented with a fantastical approach. It seems the religious and moral implications of animals were far more significant than matching a physical likeness in these renderings. Nona C. Flores explains, "By the tenth century, artists were increasingly bound by allegorical interpretation, and abandoned naturalistic depictions."

== See also ==
- Bestiary
- Fearsome critters
- Lists of legendary creatures
- List of legendary creatures by type
- List of cryptids
- Non-physical entity
