= Dipsa =

Mythological snake

The fly genus Dipsa is a junior synonym of Lonchoptera.

Dipsa is a tiny, mucus-like, extremely venomous snake from Medieval bestiaries. They were so venomous that their victim would die before becoming aware he had been bitten.
