= Monoceros (legendary creature) =

Legendary creature with only one horn

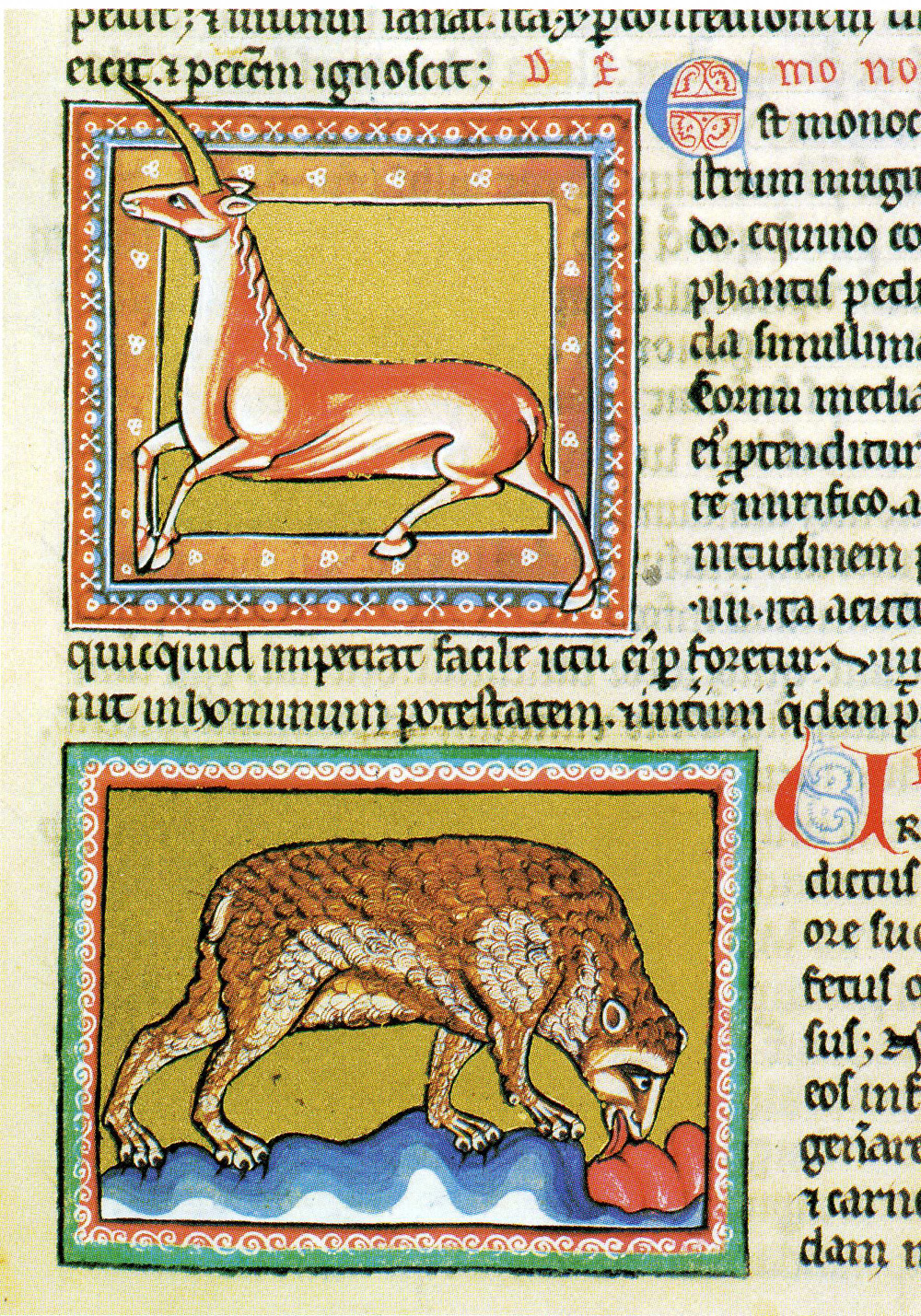
The monoceros (above) as pictured in the Bodleian Library, Ashmole Bestiary, Folio 21r.

The monoceros (Ancient Greek: μονόκερως) is a legendary animal with only one horn, related to the unicorn.

== Mythology ==
It derives from the Greek word μονόκερως (monokerōs), a compound word from μόνος (monos) which means "only one" / "single" and κέρας (keras) (neuter gender), which means "horn".

The monoceros was first described in Pliny the Elder's Natural History as a creature with the body of a horse, the head of a stag (minus the antlers), the feet of an elephant, and the tail of a wild boar. It has one black horn in the middle of its forehead, which is two cubits (about 1 m or 3 feet) in length, and is impossible to capture alive.

Cosmas Indicopleustes, in the Christian Topography, writes that he did not see the animal, but he did see brazen figures of it at the palace of the king of Aethiopia and from these figures he was able to draw it. He also mentions that the people speak of it as a terrible beast and invincible, and that all its strength lies in its horn. When it is pursued by many hunters and is about to be caught, it springs up to the top of some precipice, whence it falls down. Then, while falling, it turns so that the horn sustains all the shock of the fall, and it escapes unhurt.

In today's English language, the term monoceros typically refers to a unicorn or similar one-horned creature.

== See also ==
- Elasmotherium
- Rhinoceros
- Unicorn
