= Tarand (animal) =

Legendary reindeer-like creature with chameleon properties

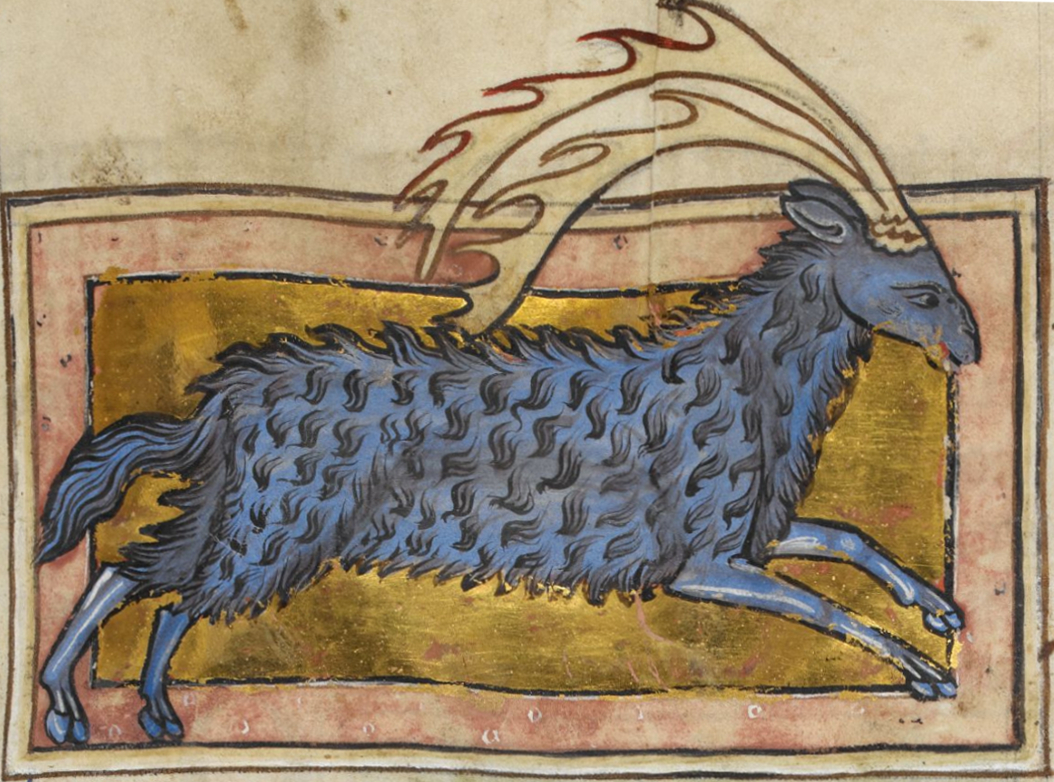
Illustration of a Tarand exhibiting a blue color.

A tarand, also known as a tarandos, tarandus, parandrus, or parandros, is a legendary reindeer/moose-like creature with chameleon properties. It was first described in Aristotle's Corpus Aristotelicum as Tarandos (Τάρανδος). It was also mentioned in Pliny's History of the Animals (Tarandus), Aelian's De Natura Animalium (Tarandos), Solinus (Parandrus) and Caesar, appearing again in key texts of the medieval period, such as The York Mystery Cycle (1440) and Francois Rabelais' Pantagruel (1552). The veracity of the tarand was discussed by Jean Léopold Nicolas Frédéric, Baron Cuvier (1769–1832).

Aristotle, Pliny and Aelian write that the animal (Tarandus) was living in Scythia, while Solinus write that the animal that he describes (Parandus) was living in Aethiopia.

== Origin and description ==
=== Aristotle ===
Among the Scythians called Geloni they say that there is a beast, excessively rare, which is called tarandus; they say that it changes the colour of its hair according to the place it is in. For this reason it is difficult to catch; for it becomes the same colour as the trees and the ground, and generally of the place in which it is. But the changing of the colour of the hair is most remarkable; other creatures change their skin like the chameleon and polypus. But this animal is of the size of an ox. But its head is of the same kind as a deer.

=== Pliny ===
After having described the chameleon, Pliny (trans. Holland, 1601) provided a detailed description and discussion of the tarand:

IN Scythia there is a beast called Tarandus, which chaungeth likewise colour as the Chamæleon: and no other creature bearing haire doth the same, unlesse it be the Lycaon of India, which (by report) hath a maned necke. As for the Thos (which are a kind of wolves somewhat longer than the other common-wolves, and shorter legged, quicke and swift in leaping, living altogether of the venison that they hunt and take, without doing any harme at all to men) they may be said, not so much to chaunge their hew, as their habite and apparell: for all winter time they be shag-haired, but in summer bare and naked. The Tarandus is as bigge as an oxe, with an head not unlike to a stagges, but that it is greater, namely, carrying braunched hornes: cloven hoofed, and his haire as deepe as is the Beares. The hide of his backe is so tough and hard, that thereof they make brest-plates. He taketh the colour of all trees, shrubs, plants, flowers, and places wherein he lieth when he retireth for feare; and therefore seldome is he caught. But when he list to looke like himselfe and be in his owne colour, he resembleth an Asse. To conclude, straunge it is that the bare bodies of a beast should alter into so many colours: but much more straunge it is and wonderfull, that the haire also should chaunge.

=== Aelian ===
... But the animal known as Tarandus transforms itself hair and all, and can adopt such an infinite variety of colours as to bewilder the eye. It is a native of Scythia and its back and size resembles a bull; and the Scythians cover their shields with its hide and consider it a good counter to a spear.

== Appearances in literature ==
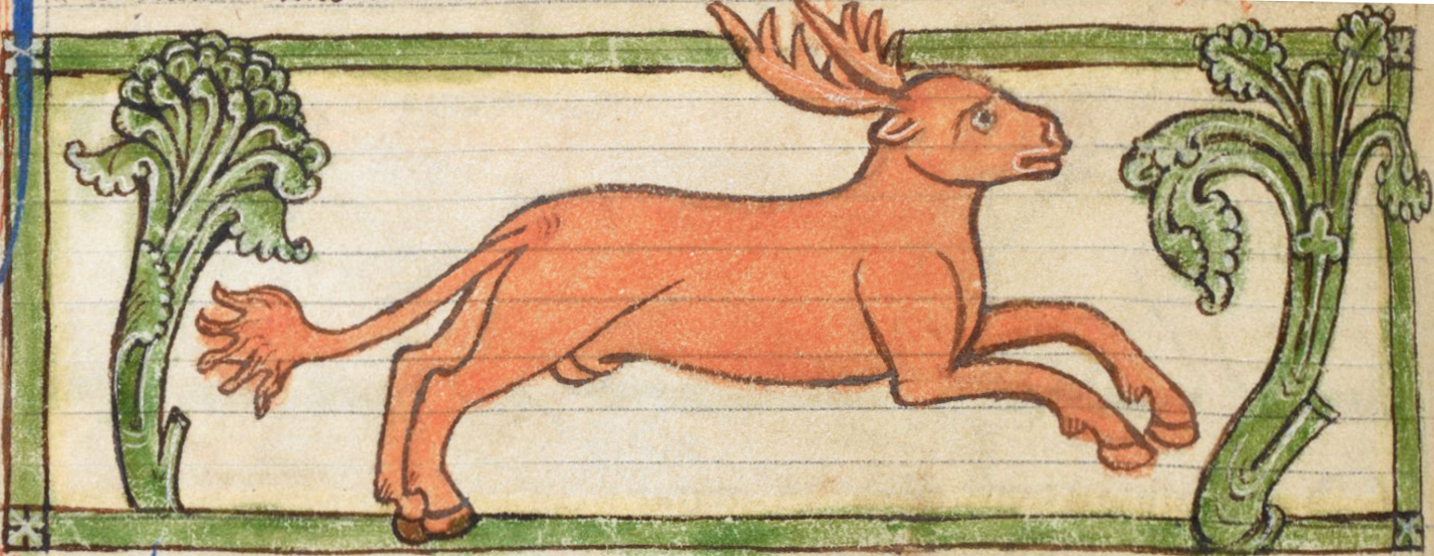
Parandrus (Bestiary Harley MS 3244, 13th century, British Library)

According to the Oxford English Dictionary, the first reference in English to the tarand is in the medieval play The York Mystery Cycle ("All þin vntrew techyngis þus taste I, þou tarand", or in modern English "All your untrue teachings thus I test, you tarand").

The tarand is described in Book 4, Chapter 2 of Francois Rabelais' Pantagruel (1552):

A tarand is an animal as big as a bullock, having a head like a stag, or a little bigger, two stately horns with large branches, cloven feet, hair long like that of a furred Muscovite, I mean a bear, and a skin almost as hard as steel armour. The Scythian said that there are but few tarands to be found in Scythia, because it varieth its colour according to the diversity of the places where it grazes and abides, and represents the colour of the grass, plants, trees, shrubs, flowers, meadows, rocks, and generally of all things near which it comes. It hath this common with the sea-pulp, or polypus, with the thoes, with the wolves of India, and with the chameleon, which is a kind of a lizard so wonderful that Democritus hath written a whole book of its figure and anatomy, as also of its virtue and propriety in magic. This I can affirm, that I have seen it change its colour, not only at the approach of things that have a colour, but by its own voluntary impulse, according to its fear or other affections; as, for example, upon a green carpet I have certainly seen it become green; but having remained there some time, it turned yellow, blue, tanned, and purple in course, in the same manner as you see a turkey-cock’s comb change colour according to its passions. But what we find most surprising in this tarand is, that not only its face and skin, but also its hair could take whatever colour was about it. Near Panurge, with his kersey coat, its hair used to turn grey; near Pantagruel, with his scarlet mantle, its hair and skin grew red; near the pilot, dressed after the fashion of the Isiacs of Anubis in Egypt, its hair seemed all white, which two last colours the chameleons cannot borrow. When the creature was free from any fear or affection, the colour of its hair was just such as you see that of the asses of Meung.

The tarand is mentioned again in Pantagruel: "I have found here a Scythian tarand, an animal strange and wonderful for the variations of colour on its skin and hair, according to the distinction of neighbouring things; it is as tractable and easily kept as a lamb. Be pleased to accept of it."
