= Hydrus (legendary creature) =

Legendary creature in the medieval european bestiary

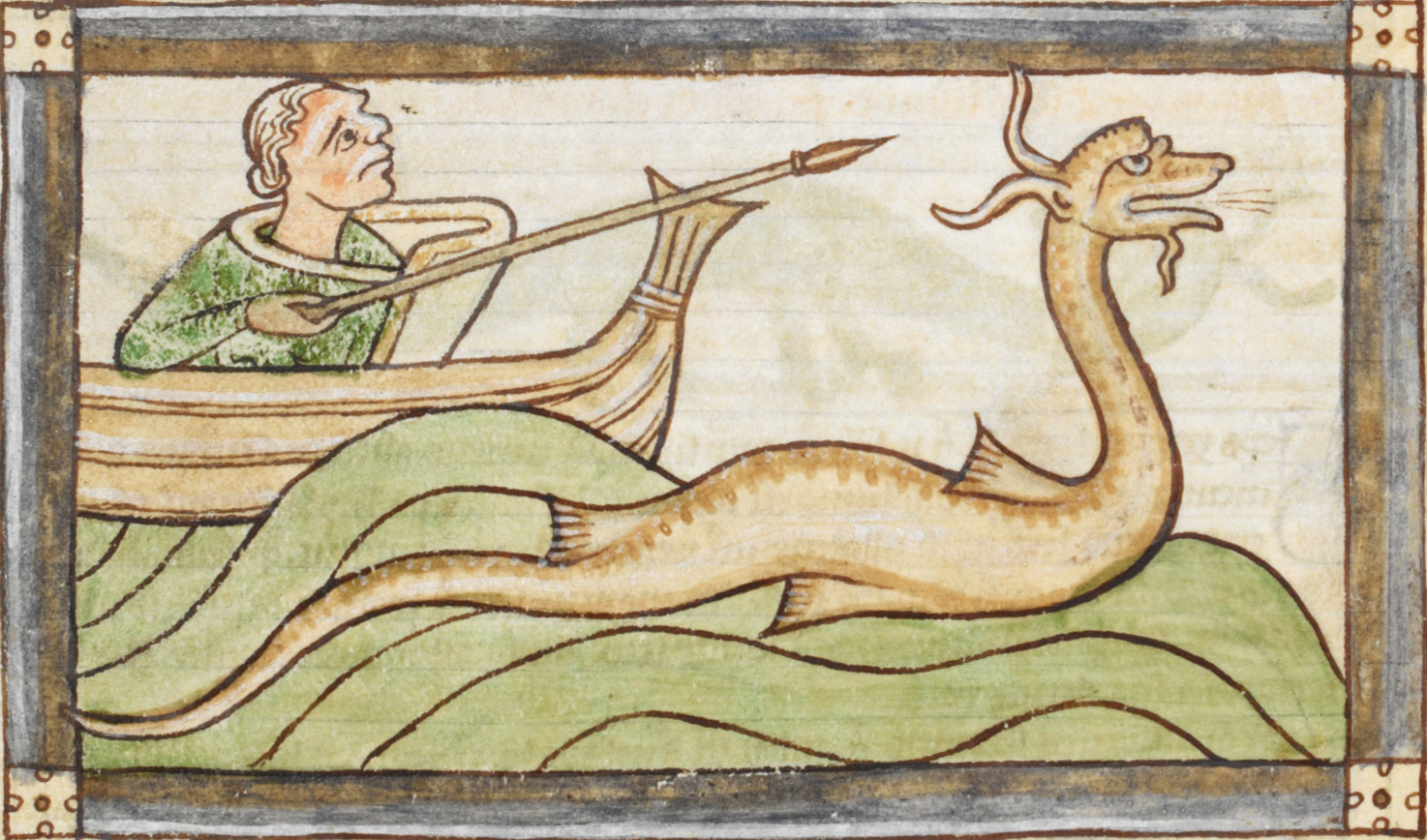
- A rare depiction of the hydrus without a crocodile

Creature information
- Folklore: Medieval bestiary

Origin
- Habitat: The Nile

The Hydrus (also known as Enhydros, Enidros, Hildris, Hydra, Hidri, Idra, Idres, Ydre, Ydris, and Ydrus) is a creature from Medieval bestiaries.

== Description ==
A hydrus has no set appearance. Normally it is considered to be a water snake. Other animals the hydrus has been thought of as include a bird, a dragon, and a mongoose. The hydrus is considered to be a very intelligent creature for its ability to trick crocodiles.

Pliny the Elder described the hydrus as a amphibious serpent with stronger venom than any other snake. He also says that the hydrus' liver can be used as an antidote to its bite.

== Mythology ==
They were said to be found in the Nile River. It is said that the hydrus hated crocodiles, and would intentionally roll in the mud and seek out a crocodile while it slept with its mouth open. The slimy mud allowed it to slip down the crocodile's throat. Once inside the crocodile's stomach, the hydrus would burst free from the stomach lining, ripping out the crocodile's entrails and leaving it to die. In medieval Christian tradition, this bursting free from the crocodile became an emblem of the resurrection of Christ bursting free from Hell.

Depictions of the hydrus and crocodile in medieval manuscripts
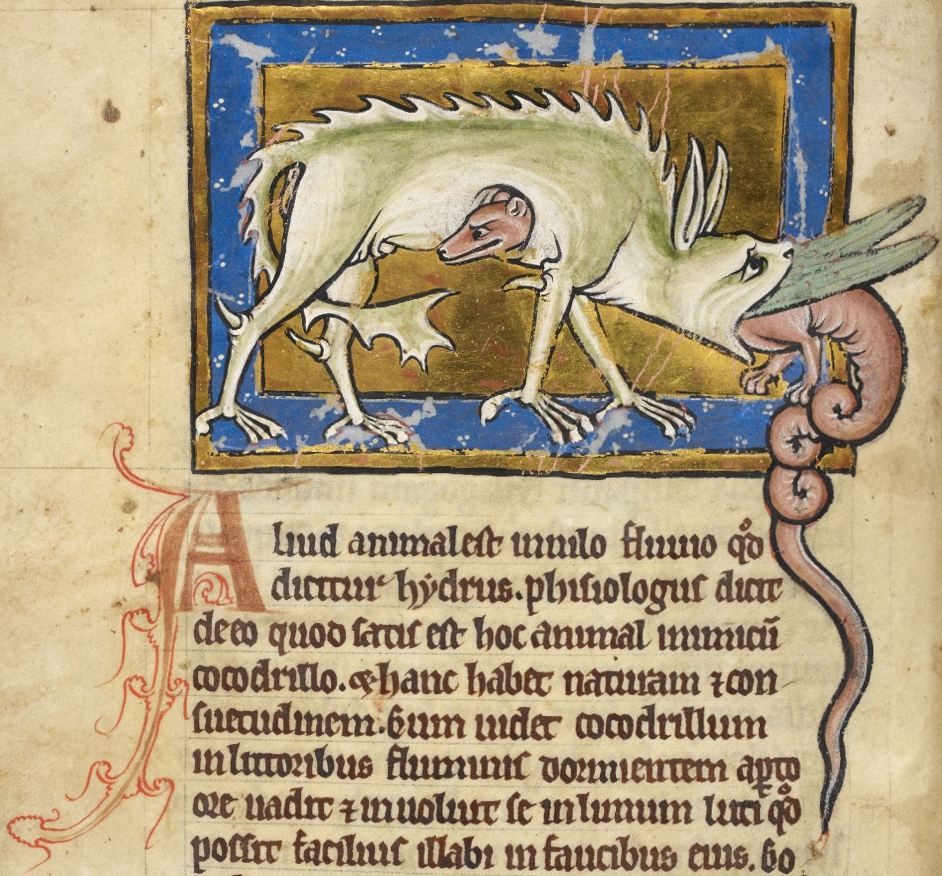

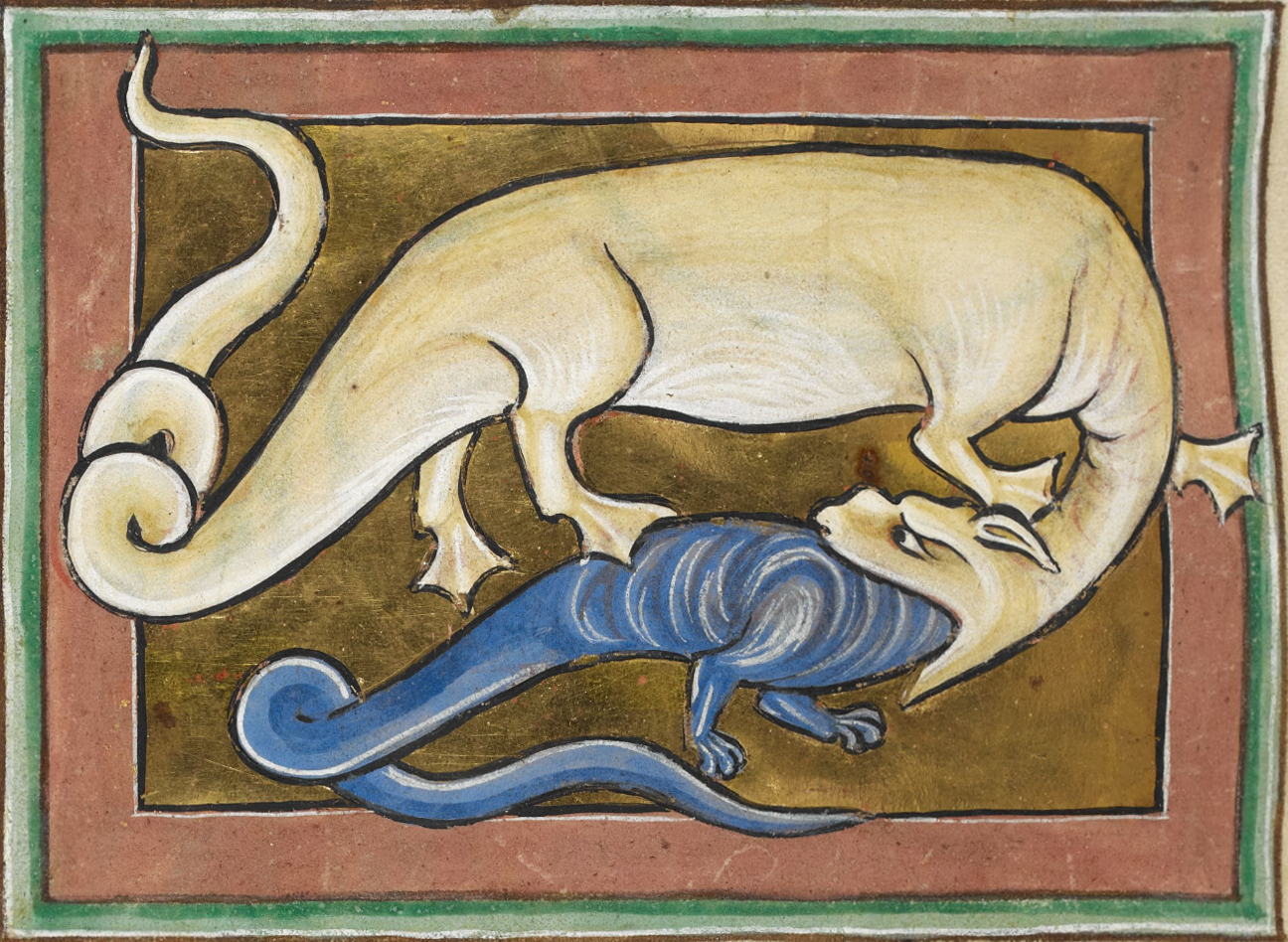

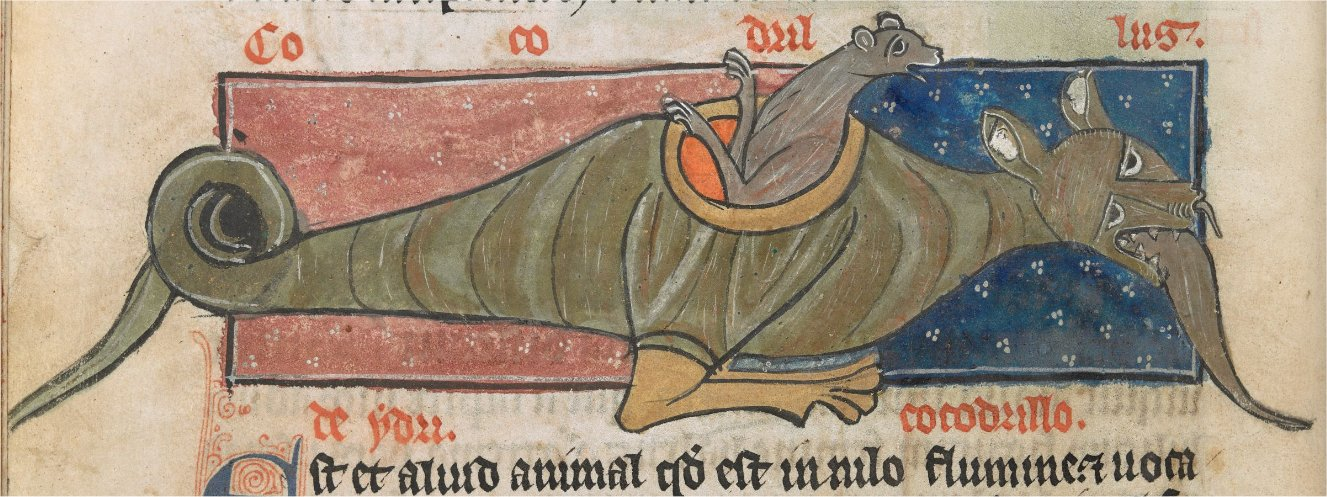

== See also ==
- Lernaean Hydra
