= Hugh of Fouilloy =

12th century French cleric

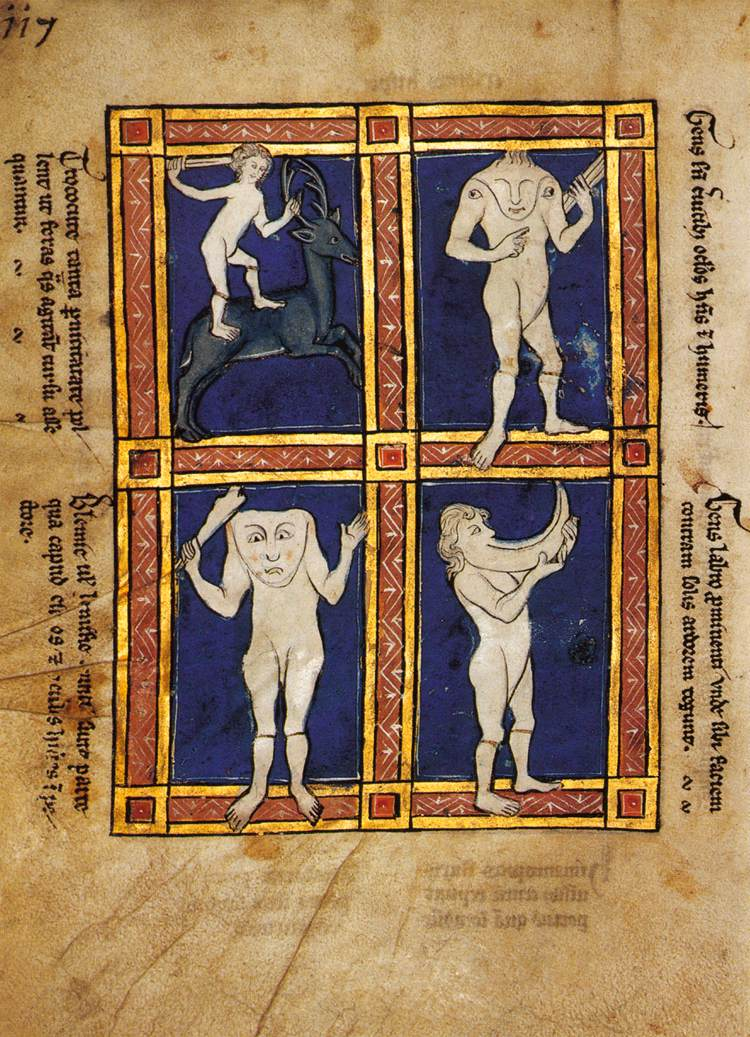

Hugh of Fouilloy (born between 1096 and 1111 in Fouilloy (near Amiens); died c. 1172, Saint-Laurent-au-Bois) was a French cleric, prior of St.-Nicholas-de-Regny (1132) and St.-Laurent-au-Bois (1152). He is notable for writing De claustro animae (The Cloister of the Soul) and De medicina animae (The Medicine of the Soul), allegorical texts on monastic spirituality. His De avibus, a moral treatise on birds was incorporated into many versions of the popular medieval bestiary.

== De Avibus ==
De avibus contains around sixty chapters in two sections. The first part is mainly scriptural exegesis, drawn from the Bible and the Physiologus. The dove is the subject of the first eleven chapters, the winds and the hawk of the following eleven chapters, the turtledove and sparrow and their nesting habits of the next fifteen.

The second part consists of twenty-three chapters, each of which describes a different bird. The author draws upon the Etymologiae of Isidore of Seville which assembled extracts of many books from classical antiquity that would have otherwise been lost, De natura rerum by Rabanus Maurus, Gregory's Moralia in Job, and Ambrose's Hexaemeron.

The text is known by several alternative names such as the Aviarium (The Aviary), De columba deargentata (The Silvered Dove), and De tribus columbis (The three Doves). Another title, Libellus quidam ad Rainerum conversum cognomine Corder Benignum (The little Book for Rainier the Lay-Brother Called the Kindhearted), reveals to whom the book was dedicated. Hugh's prologue says that De Avibus was intended as "a teaching text for the lay brothers". It was probably written between 1132 and 1152 while Hugh was prior of St.-Nicholas-de-Regny.

According to Badke's Medieval Bestiary, "at least 125 manuscript copies of the De avibus still exist, though some include only part of the text. Most are illustrated, and copies of it are known from all across Europe. For the most part the text appears in manuscripts along with other theological works, often with some of Hugh's other books".
