= Salamanders in folklore =

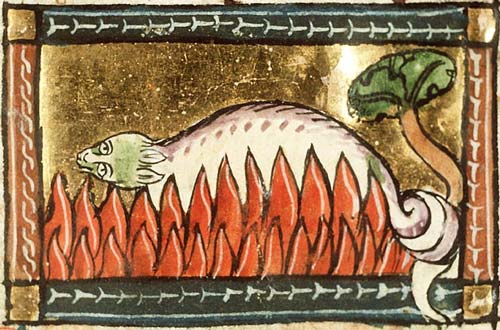
A salamander unharmed in the fire (Bestiary, 14th century)

The salamander is an amphibian of the order Urodela which once, like many real creatures, often was imagined to have fantastic and sometimes occult qualities by pre-modern authors, as in the allegorical descriptions of animals in medieval bestiaries. The legendary salamander is often depicted as a typical salamander in shape, with a lizard-like form, but is usually ascribed an affinity with fire, sometimes specifically elemental fire.

== European lore ==
Ancient and medieval commentators ascribed many fantastical abilities to the natural salamander. Many of these qualities are rooted in verifiable traits of the natural creature but often exaggerated. A large body of legend, mythology, and symbolism has developed around this creature over the centuries. Carl Linnaeus in the 10th edition of Systema Naturae of 1758 established the scientific description of the salamander and noted the chief characteristics described by the ancients: the reported ability to live in fire, and the oily exudates.

The salamander were discussed allegorically in the writings of Christian fathers as well as in the Physiologus and bestiaries.

=== Classical ===
Aristotle, Pliny, Nicander, Aelian

The standard lore of the salamander as a creature enduring fire and extinguishing it was known by the Ancient Greeks, as far back as the 4th century BC, by Aristotle (384–322 BC) and his successor Theophrastus (c. 371–c. 287 BC) who gave such description of the σαλαμάνδρα (salamandra). The salamander's mastery over fire is described by Aristotle in his History of Animals, while his Generation of Animals offers the explanation that since there are creatures belonging to the elements of earth, air and water, salamander must be such a creature that belongs to the element of fire. Theophrastus refers to the salamander as a lizard ("saura") whose emergence is a sign of rain.

The Ancient Greek physician Nicander (2nd century BC), in his Therica, provides another early source of the lore of fire-resistance. (Note: Nicander, Therica 818.) In his Alexipharmaca, he describes the product of the salamander, referred to as the "sorcerer's lizard" (or "sorceress's lizard", φαρμακίδος σαύρη (Note: Also may simply mean "poisonous lizard" according to LSJ.)) in the form of poisonous potion. The aftereffects of ingestion included symptoms of "inflammation of the tongue, chills, trembling of the joints, livid welts, and lack of mental lucidity". (Note: Nicander, Alexipharmaca 537–541) A person who consumed this beverage ("draught") was thus enfeebled and reduced to crawling on all fours, as illustrated in the Paris manuscript of the work. It is puzzling why people would so frequently ingest the debilitating salamander potion such as to merit a warning. One conjecture is that a person could have been secretly administered a dose of poison or charm by another. (Note: Conjecturally, the love potion described by Theocritus (3rd century BC), Idyll 2.58 as requiring ground up lizard may also refer to the salamander, according to the thesis by Ella Faye Wallace.) Another possibility is the accidental introduction of it into food or drink. Pliny the Elder (23–79 AD) warns of its effects of (detrimental) hair loss, (Note: Pliny states in one place that the spot that loses hair is left with leprous skin. (Book 10) Elsewhere Pliny states that a mere touch of its saliva at one spot, even the soul of one's foot, could cause the loss of all body hair.) though other sources hint at its controlled use for the "removal of unwanted hairs".

Pliny described the salamander "an animal like a lizard in shape and with a body specked all over; it never comes out except during heavy showers and goes away the moment the weather becomes clear." (Note: Latin: "sicut salamandrae, animal lacertae figura, stellatum, numquam nisi magnis imbribus proveniens et serenitate desinens".) Pliny's description of physical markings suggest possible identification with the fire salamander (Salamandra salamandra), perhaps one of its subspecies. (Note: Pliny also refers in the preceding chapter (XXIX.22) to "stellio" or "starred lizard" that provides antidote to scorpion venom; these "star-like markings" are consistent with the golden Alpine salamander (Salamandra atra aurorae) of Europe that has golden or yellow spots or blotches on its back) Pliny even made the important distinction between salamanders and lizards, which are similar in shape but different in other respects, which was not systematized until modern times, when biologists classified lizards as reptiles and salamanders as amphibians.

Pliny offers the frigidity of their bodies as an alternate explanation to why the salamander can extinguish fire, considered implausible. (Note: Aristotle's "element" theory and Pliny constitute the two major explanations for fire resistance among some 90 references to the salamander in antiquity (Hillman (2001), p. 94). Cf. also his note 5 "74. Note that Pliny is adamantly opposed to this view.. if this belief were true it would have al- ready been demonstrated") Note that Pliny offers this explanation in one part of his work, while elsewhere he disbelieves the premise that the salamander has such fire-quenching capability, pointing out that if such an idea were true, it should be easy to demonstrate. (Note: As pointed out by Hillman (2001), p. 94, notes 5 (partially quoted above) and note 6.) Pliny also reports that his contemporary Sextius Niger denied the idea that salamanders could extinguish fire, though Sextius also believed honey-preserved salamander acted as an aphrodisiac when combined with food after it was properly de-headed, gutted, etc.

Pliny also notes medicinal and poisonous properties, which are founded in fact on some level, since many species of salamander, including fire salamanders and alpine salamanders, excrete toxic, physiologically active substances. These substances are often excreted when the animal is threatened, which has the effect of deterring predators. The extent of these properties is greatly exaggerated though, with a single salamander being regarded as so toxic that by twining around a tree it could poison the fruit and so kill any who ate them and by falling into a well could slay all who drank from it, and also infect bread baking on the kiln by touching the wood or stone underneath it. (Note: The salamandar seems to poison bread by touching the firewood ("wood upon which bread is baked") in the older translation, but the modern translator corrects the omission giving "bread is placed upon wood or stone that has been touched by a salamander" (original text: "quin immo si contacto ab ea ligno, lapidi crusta panis inponatur".)

Roughly contemporary with Pliny is a bas-relief of a salamander straddling the cross-beam of a balance scale in an anvil-and-forge scene found in the ruins of the Roman town of Pompeii. Liliane Bodson identifies the animal as Salamandra salamandra, the familiar fire salamander, and suspects that it might have been a sign for a blacksmith's shop.

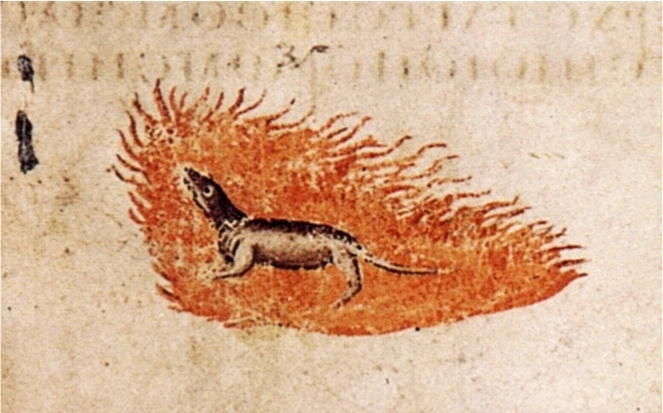
Salamander in a copy of Dioscurides ―Vienna ms. 6th cent.

Dioscorides (c. 40–90 AD) in De materia medica also repeats the lore of the salamander extinguishing fire but refutes it. Miniature paintings of salamander engulfed in flame occurs in illuminated manuscript copies, such as the Vienna Dioscurides ms. (med. gr. 1, see fig. right) and Morgan Library ms. (M. 652). The salamander purportedly had septic (or caustic and corrosive) abilities, allegedly useful in the treatment of leprosy.

A few centuries later (late 2nd–early 3rd century AD), Greek-speaking Roman author Aelian describes salamanders as being drawn to the fires of forges and quenching them, to the annoyance of the blacksmiths. Aelian is also careful to note that the salamander is not born of fire itself, unlike the pyrausta.

=== Jewish and Early Christian ===
Talmud, Augustine, Physiologus

The legendary salamandra (סָלָמַנְדְּרָה / סלמנדרה) mentioned in the Talmud was a creature engendered in fire, and according to the Hagigah 27a, anyone smeared with its blood allegedly became immune to fire. A fire salamander appears where a fire is sustained at a spot for seven days and seven nights according to the Midrash, but the fire needs be maintained 7 years according to Rashi (1040–1105), the primary commentator on the Talmud, describes the salamander as one which is produced by burning a fire in the same place for seven consecutive years.

The Byzantine St. Gregory of Nazianzus (c. 329–390) referred to a creature that could dance in fire, which destroys other creatures, referring to the salamander, as indicated by his commentator Pseudo-Nonnus, who said it was the size of a lizard or a small crocodile, though land-dwelling. (Note: The Byzantine dictionary Suda (10th cent.) has an entry under "Scaled [creatures] (φολίδωτόν", which classifies lizard, tortoise, crocodile, and salamander as scaled.)

Saint Augustine (354–430) in the City of God based the discussion of the miraculous aspects of monsters (including the salamander in fire) largely on Pliny's Natural History. Augustine used the example of the salamander to argue for the plausibility of Purgatory as a stage of purification of the dead, where human souls live but are not consumed by fire.

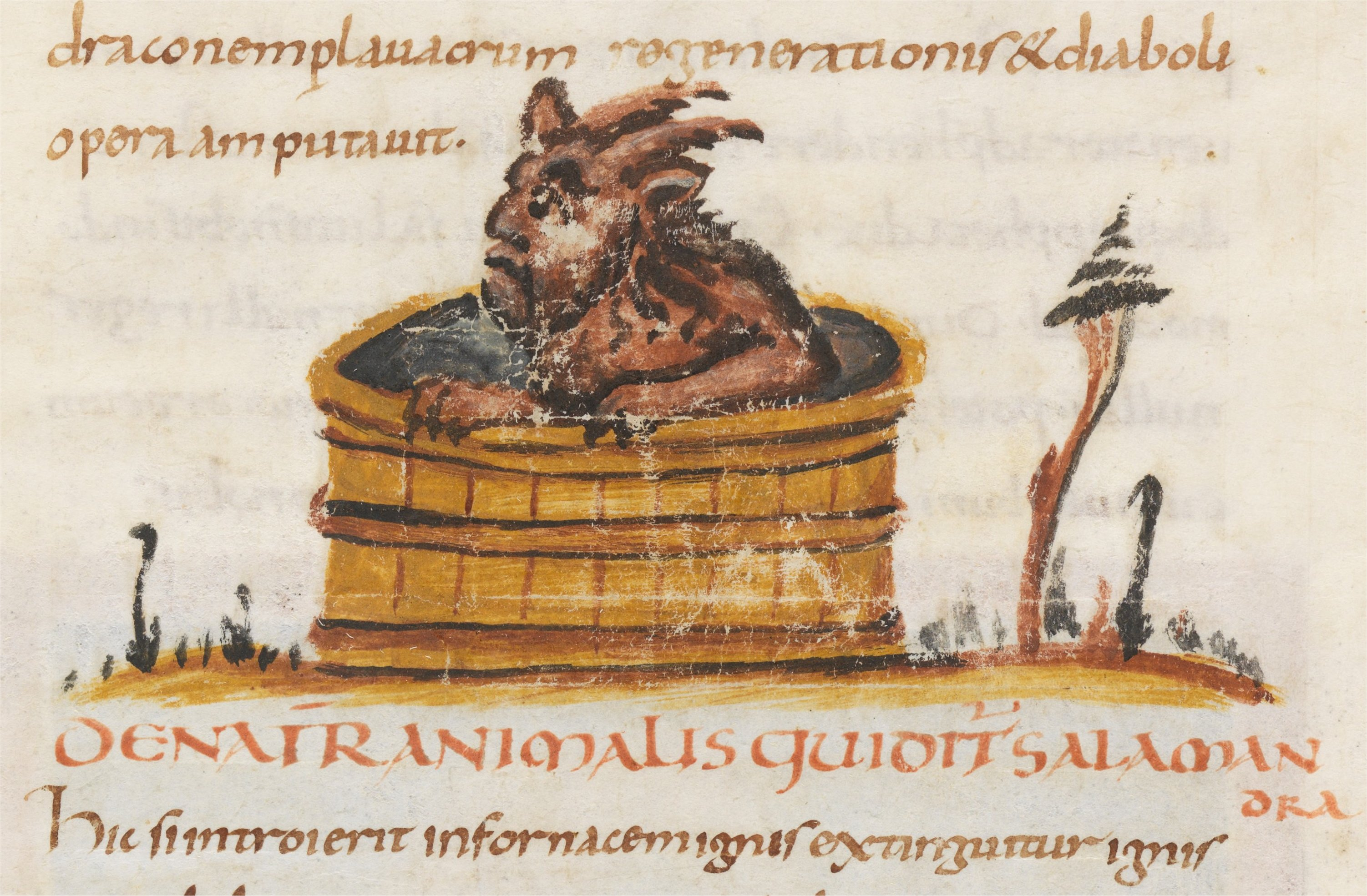
A salamandra in a tub. ―MS Bern 318 (Latin Physiologus), fol. 17v

The Physiologus thought to have been originally written in Greek by an author in Alexandria was a treatise on animals in the Christian context, and the antecedent of the later medieval bestiaries. It is possible the inclusion of "salamander" reflects the author's familiarity with the author's native (African) fauna. In the Physiologus the salamander was allegoric for the three men cast into Nebuchadnezzar's fiery furnace and survived.

An early surviving illustrated example is the Bern Physiologus of the 9th century, with the illustration (fig. right) described as "a satyr-like creature in a circular wooden tub".

=== Early medieval Hermeticism ===
The 5th century Hieroglyphica attributed to Horapollo (supposed original written in Coptic) also mentions the salamander entering the furnace and putting out its flames; it is pointed out this work draws from Greek classical authors as well as the Physiologus. (Note: Laufer however called Horapollo an "Egyptian priest" and presumed the contents must date to the 1st century, before Physiologus.)

The entry occurs in Hieroglyphica, Book 2, Ch. LXII. This "alleged hieroglyph" is probably dubious. (Note: The Hieroglyphics overall is "combination of the fraudulent and the genuine".) An editor of the text finds it "strange" that a "A Man Burned by Fire" is represented by the symbol of the salamander, which is incapable of being burnt. As for the fragment saying it "destroys" with "each of its two heads" (ἑκατέρᾳ τῇ κεφαλῇ), this is thought to be a contamination with the lore of the two-headed amphisbaena. (Note: Sbordone's footnote, citing Cornelius de Pauw's edition for the idea of a contamination with a second chapter lacking a beginning; and Conradus Leemans's edition for identifying the amphisbaena.)

=== High Middle Ages ===
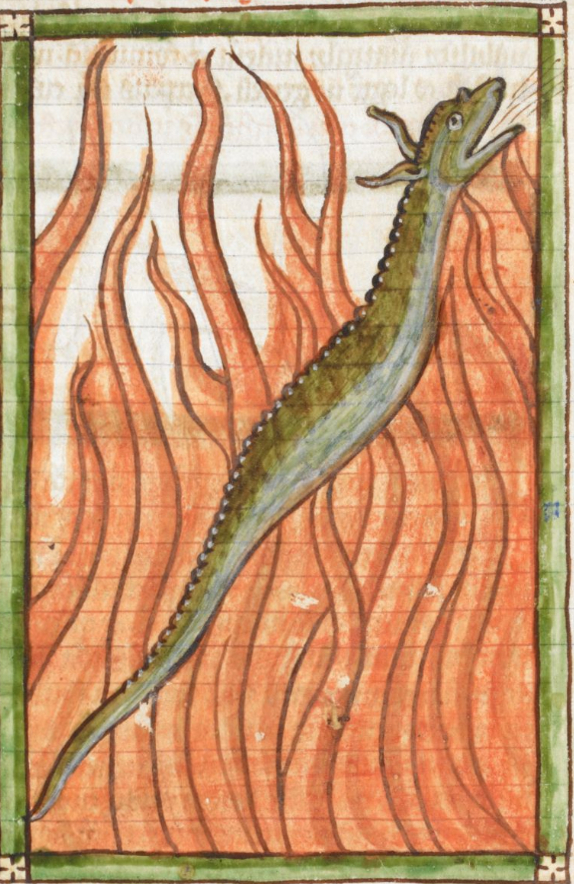
Salamander depicted in bestiary (detail) ―MS Harley 3244, fol. 63r. c. 1236.

After the end of the Classical era, depictions of the salamander became more fantastic and stylized, often retaining little resemblance to the animal described by ancient authors.

The medieval European bestiaries contain fanciful pictorial depictions of salamanders. The oldest such illustration of the salamander, according to Florence McCulloch's treatise on bestiaries, occurs in the Bern 318 manuscript, but this actually the so-called Bern Physiologus of the 9th century, discussed above. Other iconographic examples come from bestiaries of the post-millennium, e.g., "a worm penetrating flames" (Bodleian 764, 12c.), (Note: MS Bodleian 764, fol. 55. Text edited by Barber.) "a winged dog" ("GC", BnF fr. 1444. 13c. (Note: GC=Guillaume le Clerc bestiary, originally written 1210–11. Bibliothèque nationale de France fr. 1444, fol. 253v.)), and "a small bird in flames" (BnF fr. 14970, 13c. (Note: fol. BnF fr. 14970, 23v. 13th century)).

The so-called second family group of bestiaries describe the salamander as not only impervious to fire, but the most poisonous of all poisonous creatures (or serpents). And (as Pliny had explained) its presence in a tree infects all its apples, and renders the water of the well poisonous to all who drink it. It dwells and survives in fire, and can extinguish fire as well.

The bestiary of MS Bodley 764 (which is second family) has different incipit which reads "There is an animal called the dea, in Greek 'salamander' or 'stellio' in. Latin", (Note: "Latin: "Est animal quod dicitur dea. quod dicitur salamandra grece. latine uero stellio".) yet it still is followed by a separate chapter on the stellio newt. (Note: The MS Bodley 764 (unlike most 2nd family txts) omits "saura" that should follow "salamandra", so "stellio" comes immediately after. It also makes certain interpolations in the "stellio" chapter. (Clark (2006), p. 242).)

German polymath Albertus Magnus described the incombustible asbestos cloth as "salamander's plumage" (pluma salamandri) in his work. (Cf. § Transmission of salamander-asbestos cloth lore below)

==== Love/anti-love symbolism ====
There seems to be a confused use of the salamander, as the symbol of passionate love and its opposite, its dispassionate restraint. The salamander in Christian art represents "faith over passion", according to one critic, or a symbol of chastity in religious art, a view by Duchalais seconded by Émile Mâle. In the rose windows of Notre Dame de Paris, the figure of Chasity holds a shield depicting a salamander (though perhaps depicted rather bird-like). (Note: In full color, it appears to be a yellow beast in red flames.)

In medieval Arthurian literature, the salamander who dwells in the fire of Agrimont (Note: Agrimontin) is invoked by the character Tschinotulander (var. Schionatulander, Schoynatulander) in professing his love for Sigune. Tschinotulander owns an oriental made shield, which "contains a living salamander" whose "proper" fiery heat enhances the powers of the surrounding gemstones" but, it is explained by Lady Aventiure, it is the heathens who take the salamander as a love symbol, when it fact, it represents the opposite, unminne or "un-love". (Note: Volfing (2007) Endnote 81 citing J. T. 4027–4029: "des taten nicht die haiden.. (4028).. salamander.. da mit dew weip durch minne.. (4029).. vnminne dew immer prennet".) (Note: In this work, Ledobodantz von Gredimonte (var. Ledibodantz) not only wears a basilisk as a heraldic device (J. T. 3985), but carries a live basilisk, and it must be dealt with using a mirror.)

In the poem by Petrarch (1304–1374), (Note: Petrarch, Canzone 207) the salamander is used to represent "infinite, burning desire".

=== Renaissance ===
Leonardo da Vinci (1452–1519) wrote the following on the "salamãndra" : "This has no digestive organs, and gets no food but from the fire, in which it constantly renews its scaly skin. The salamander, which renews its scaly skin in the fire,―for virtue".

Commentators in Europe still persisted in grouping "crawling things" (reptiles or reptilia in Latin) together and thus creatures in this group, which typically included salamanders (Latin salamandrae), dragons (Latin dracones or serpentes), and basilisks (Latin basilisci), were often associated, as in Conrad Lycosthenes' Prodigiorum ac ostentorum chronicon of 1557.

Of all the traits ascribed to salamanders, the ones relating to fire have stood out most prominently. This connection probably originates from a behavior common to many species of salamander: hibernating in and under rotting logs. When wood was brought indoors and put on the fire, the creatures "mysteriously" appeared from the flames. The 16th-century Italian artist Benvenuto Cellini (1500–1571) famously recalled witnessing just such an appearance as a child in his autobiography. Thomas Bulfinch in his commentary about Cellini's encounter explains that a salamander exudes a milky substance when frightened, which could plausibly protect it long enough to survive the fire as it scurried away.

==== Paracelsus ====
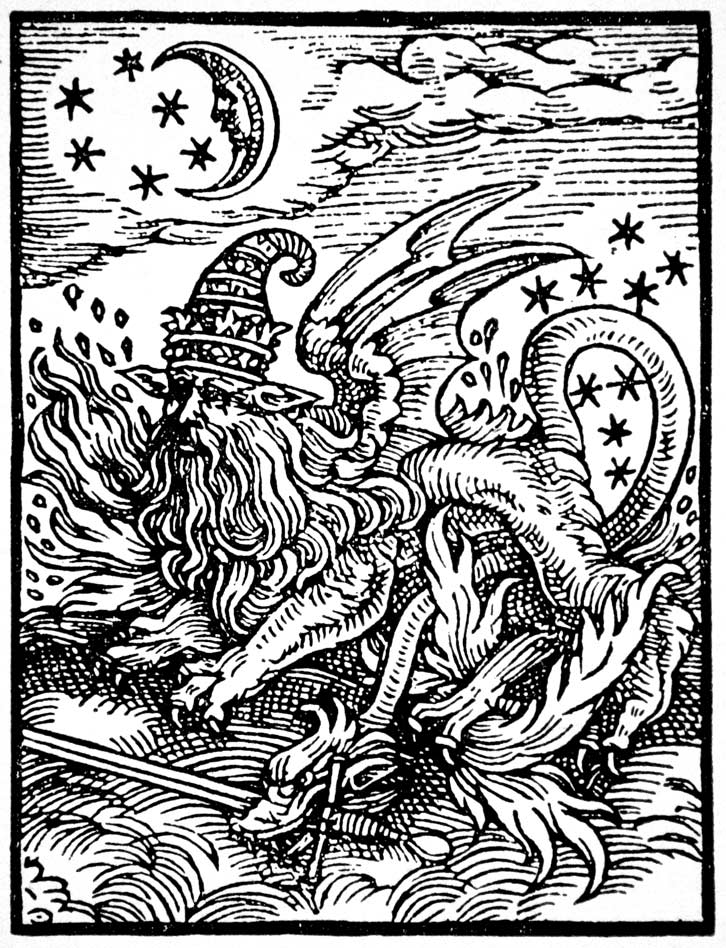
Sixteenth-century woodcut questionably identified as a depiction of a salamander by Manly P. Hall

Paracelsus (1493–1541) suggested that salamanders were the elementals of fire, (Note: Hartmann (1902): p. 151 "they have reason.. but no spiritual soul"; "they have children.. like themselves"; p. 152 "Their habits resemble those of men.. eat and drink and make their clothing"; p. 154 "Salamanders are long, lean, and dry" "Salamandars cannot associate with [human] on account of the fiery nature of the element wherein they live"; p. 155–156 "Undine may marry a man.. and her children will be human.. moreover, the Undine herself thereby receives the germ of immortality"; p. 156 "the spirits of the earth, the air, and fire seldom marry a human being.. but may become attached.. and enter his service"; p. 157 "the Elemental spirts of Nature are often alluded to as 'devils', a name which they do not deserve".) which has had substantial influence on the role of salamanders in the occult. Paracelsus, contrary to the prevalent belief at the time, considered salamanders to be not devils, but similar to humans, only lacking a soul (along with giants, dwarves, mermaids, elves, and elemental spirits in human form). Salamanders due to their fiery environs cannot interact with humans as other elements may be able to do, so, whereas the undine/nymph can marry a human and will seek to do so, to gain an immortal soul, it is rare for other elements to marry humans, though they may develop a bond and become a human's servant.

Paracelsus also considered the will-o'-the-wisp to be "monsters" or the "misbegotten" of the salamander spirit. (Note: Paracelsus & Sigerist tr. (1941), p. 221 Just as sirens were "monsters" (German: Mißgeburten) of the water people (water spirit, undine), the giants of the sylphs (wind spirit), the dwarfs of the pygmies (earth spirit).)

Salamander iconography associated with Paracelsus

Frequently reprinted as Paracelsus's "salamander" image is the illustration of a salamander is presented in the (influential) 20th-century occult work by Manly P. Hall which attributes the illustration to Paracelsus. This illustration appears to originate in a 1527 anti-papal tract by Andreas Osiander and Hans Sachs, where it is identified as "the Pope as a monster". Its association with Paracelsus derives from his Auslegung der Magischen Figuren im Carthäuser Kloster zu Nũrnberg in which the author presents explanations of some illustrations found in a Carthusian monastery in Nuremberg; the illustration in question he labels as "a salamander or abominable worm with a human head and crowned with a crown and a Pope's hat thereon", which is later explained to represent the Pope. (Note: According to one essay, the Pope's hat curved at the top in the illustration is of the Jewish style, consistent with Paracelsus view the cartoon represents a pope whose teachings are "less Christian but rather Heathen/Judaic (Denn nicht Christlichen sondern Jüdisch"/Heidnisch)".) (Note: Catholic Archbishop Raymund Netzhammer (1862–1945) explained that the set of woodcuts was commissioned by Osiander based on some old "pope illustrations" found at the monastery, perhaps dating back to the time of Joachim of Fiore (d. 1202).)

==== Later alchemical treatises ====
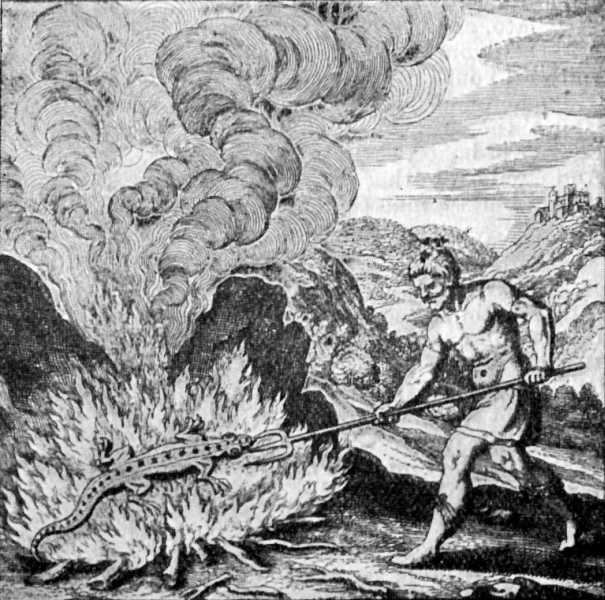
A 16th-century image of a salamander from the Book of Lambspring

A later alchemical text, the Book of Lambspring (Das Buch Lambspring, 1556), depicts a salamander as a white bird, being kept in fire by a man with a polearm. The text in German states the salamander while in fire exhibits an excellent color hue, while the Latin inscription connects this to the philosopher's stone (lapidis philosophorum). But in the Book of Lambspring inserted into Lucas Jennis Musaeum Hermeticum (1625), an illustration with the same composition (man holding a polearm) depicts the salamander as a lizard-like animal with star-like markings (see right). The author is also styled Lamspring, and his Book bears the title Tractatus de lapide philosophorum with 15 pictures. The first 10 explains the Arabic alchemical process of extracting spirit/animus from the corpus, culminating in the crowned king and salamander.

==== Gessner ====
Two salamanders of Gessner

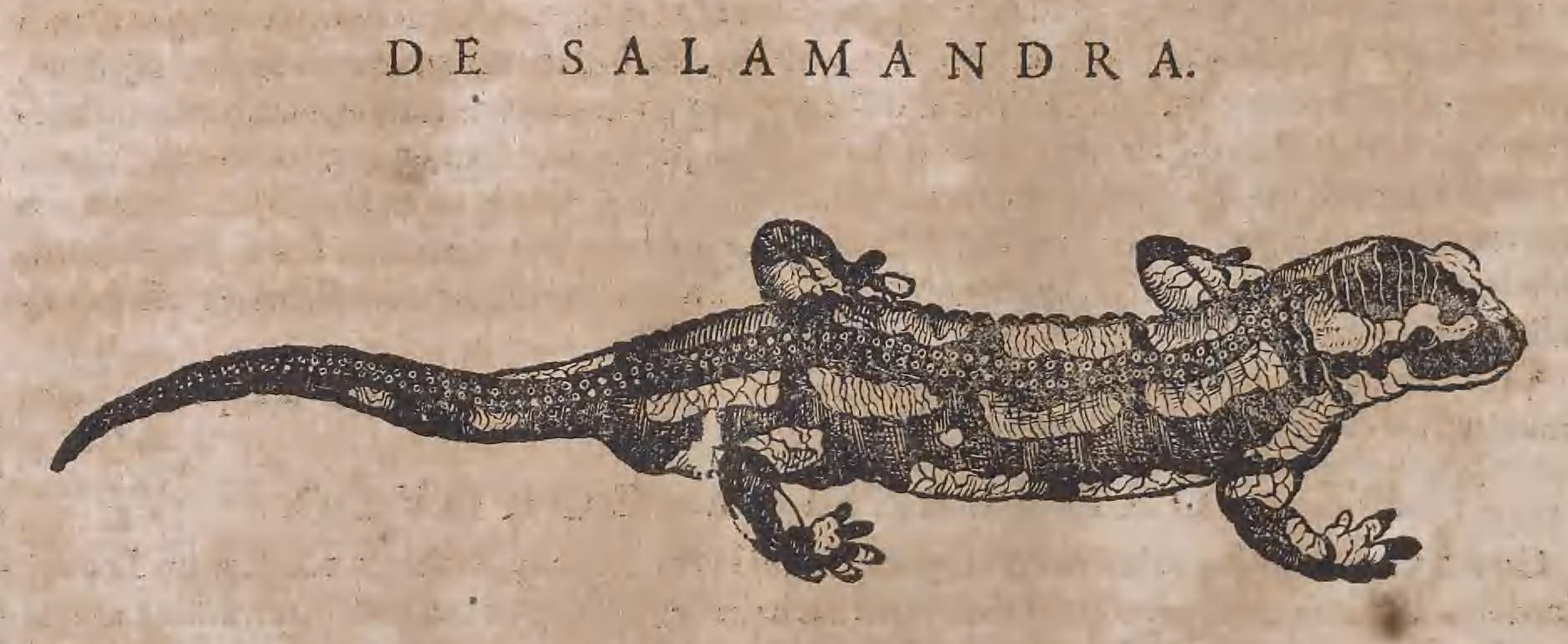
The more realistic "salamandra"

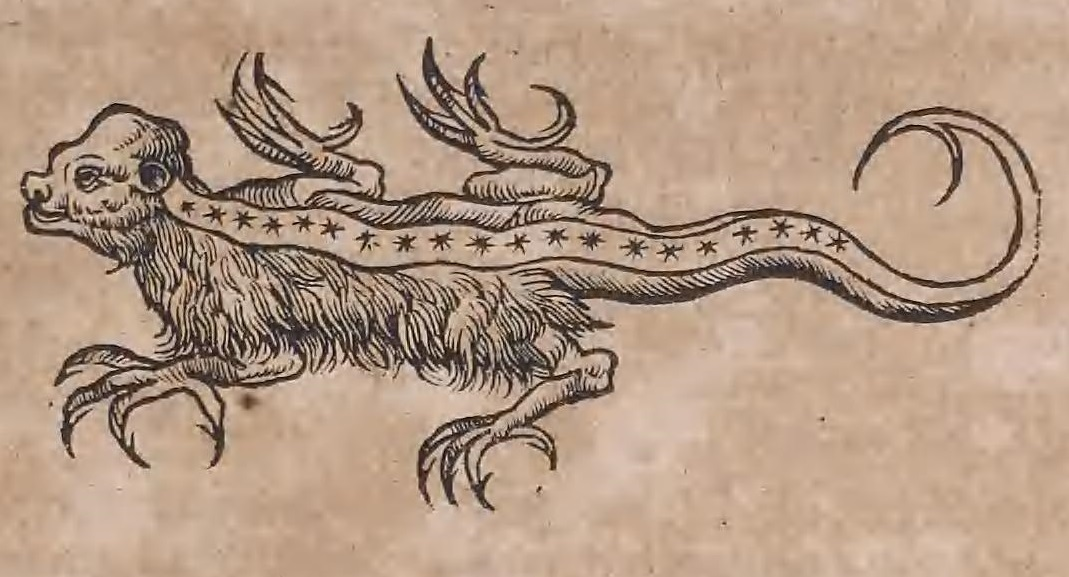
The more fanciful "salamandra"

―Conrad Gessner (1586) Historiæ animalium, Vol. 2, pp. 80–81

Conrad Gessner provided two illustrations of the salamander in his work, one realistically lifelike, the other fanciful (with mammal-like head), for comparison. In the caption to the lower image, he explains that the upper image was drawn from life, whereas in the lower image someone supposed the salamandra to be the same as the stellio ("starred" newt), and based on book knowledge, drew literal stars down its back. (Note: Gesner's fanciful salamandra seems identical to the image in Conrad Lycosthenes (Conrad Wolffhart)'s work.)

==== Baconian ====
Francis Bacon known for a more scientific approach, discusses in Sylva sylvarum (1626/1627) the possibility of the salamander's fire-resistance, stating that if one's hand is cloaked in a hermetic enough seal to shut out the fire, e.g., using egg whites, igniting the hand afterwards with alcohol will be endurable.

Thomas Browne, a follower of Baconian principles, in his Pseudodoxia Epidemica (1646) also discusses the salamander at more length, including esoterica from the past, such as the salamander's use as hieroglyphic symbol.

C.S Lewis mentions salamanders living in the fire itself, liking small dragons in his book The Chronicles of Narnia, sixth book, The Silver Chair, chapter thirteen, The Bottom of the World.

"Oh no, your Honour. Not we. It's only salamanders live in the fire itself." "What kind of beast is your salamander?" asked the Prince Rilian. "It is hard to tell their kind, you Honour," said Golg."For they are too white-hot to look at but they are most like small dragons. They speak to us out of the fire. They are wonderfully clever with their tongues: very witty and eloquent."

=== Interwar period ===
==== Fulcanelli ====
The 20th-century French esoteric writer and alchemist Fulcanelli wrote extensively on salamanders and their symbolism in alchemy. He suggested an ,incorrect, etymology of the word salamander suggesting that it originated in the Latin words sal meaning salt and mandra meaning stable. Because salamanders are associated with fire he further surmised that salt is a form of fire and stables or rocky holes are the origin of holy fire.Fulcanelli also proposed a connection between salamanders and the element of sulfur.

== In heraldry ==
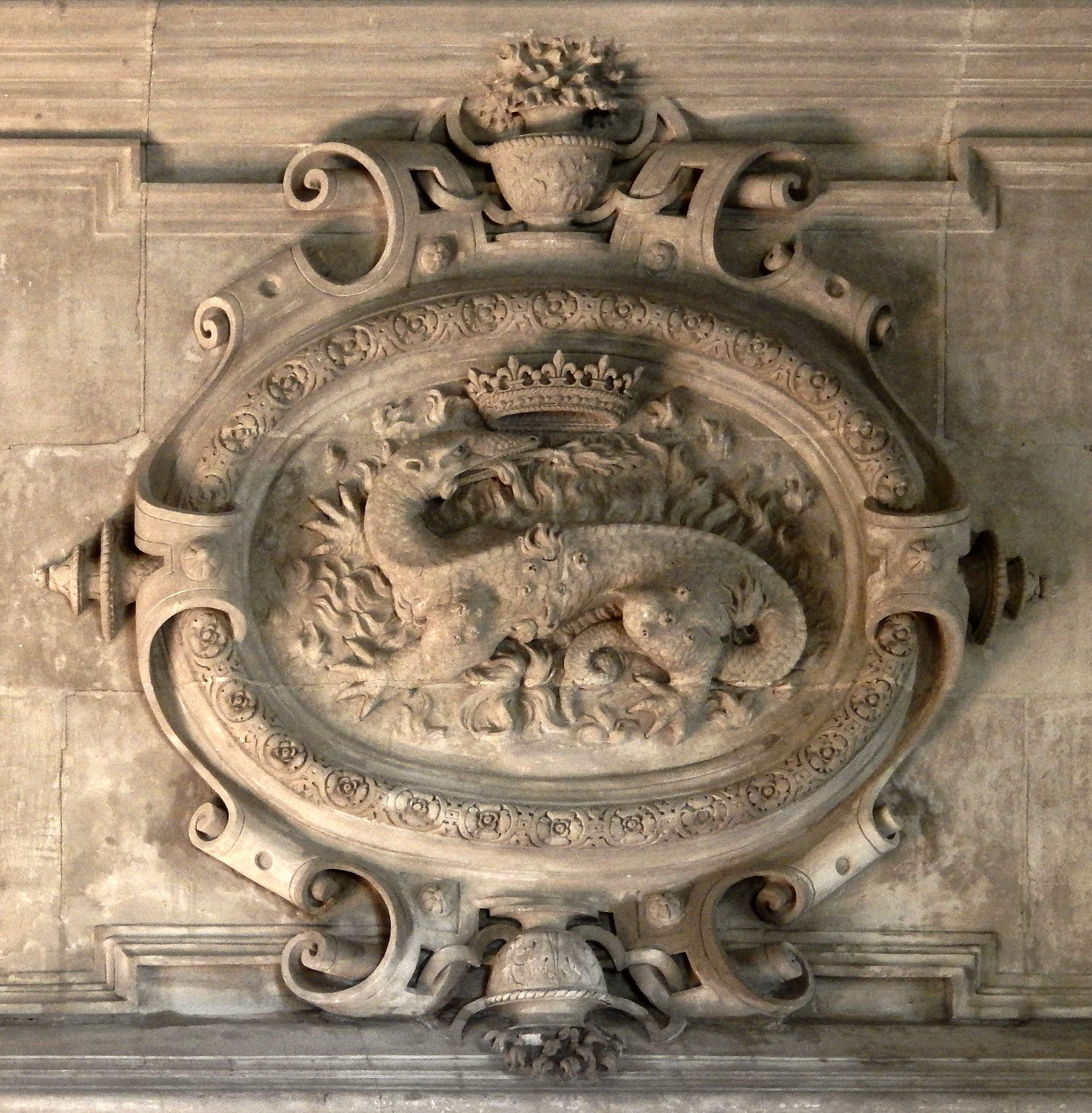
Salamander as the animal emblem of King Francis I of France ― Château d'Azay-le-Rideau, Vienne, France

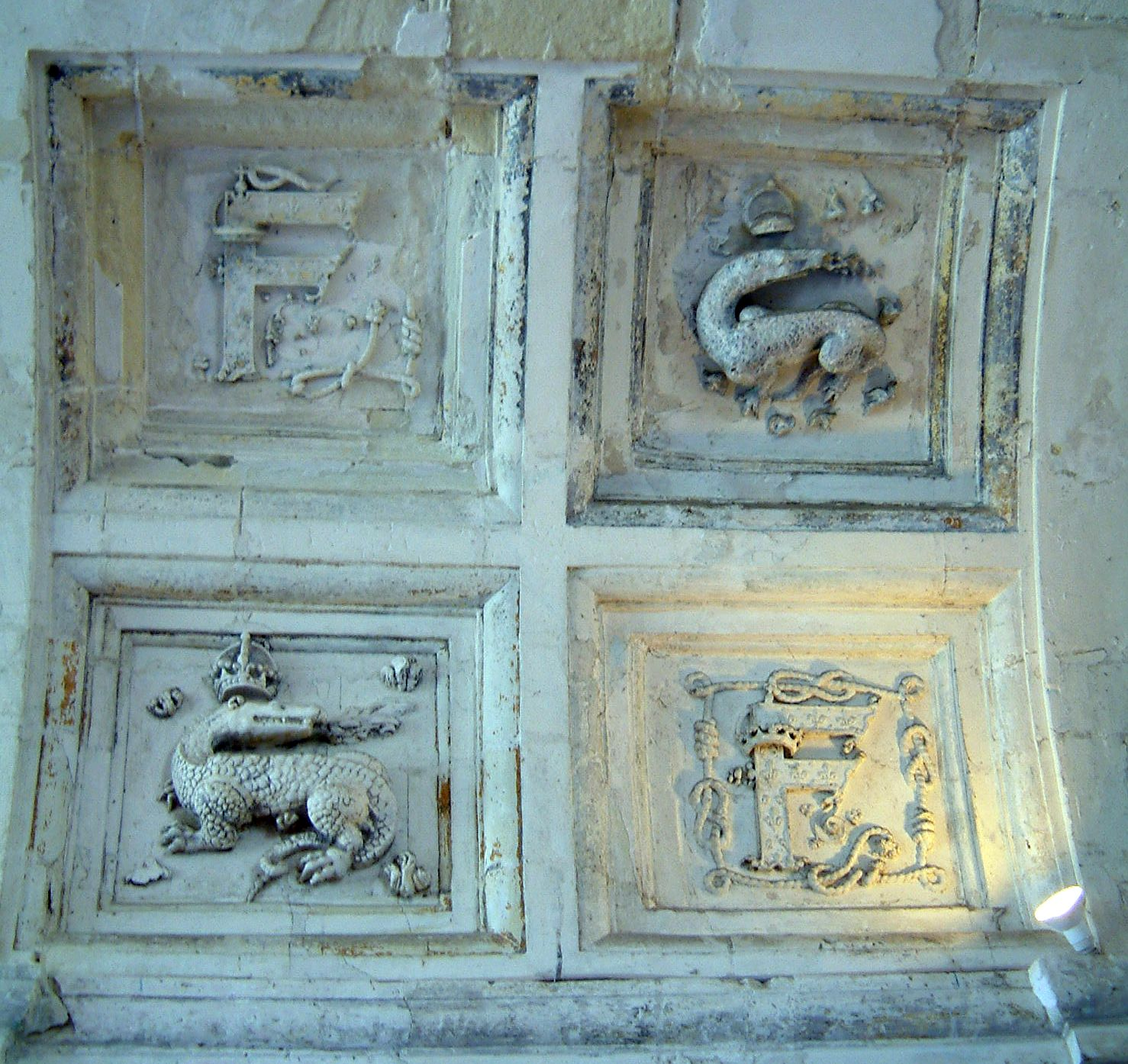
Francis I's salamander device ―Francis I's palace, Château de Chambord

In European heraldry, the salamander is typically depicted as either a lizard or a dragon within a blazing fire, sometimes also breathing out flames itself. In some instance, the heraldic salamander resembles a fire-breathing dog.

Francis I of France used a salamander as his personal emblem, as evidenced on the relief at the Château de Chambord and also displayed in the Palace of Fontainebleau and the Hôtel de Bourgtheroulde, with the motto "Nutrico et extinguo (I nurture, I extinguish)". The lizards on the crest of the Worshipful Company of Ironmongers may also have originated as salamanders.

== Modern folklore ==
In French folklore, it has been alleged that the salamander's highly toxic breath was enough to swell a person until their skin broke. In Auvergne, the salamander was known by such names as soufflet (meaning 'bellows') or souffle ('breath') or enfleboeuf ("beef-puffer"), and was thought capable of killing cattle, and in Berry was the belief salamander could cause cattle to swell, even from a considerable distance. There was also a supposed black and yellow lizard known as lebraude locally, with similar attached lore: it only breathed once every 24 hours, but the exhalation killed any humans or plants or trees. In Auvergne, it was told that the only way to eradicate the lebraude was to keep it isolated in confined space for 24 hours, and let its breath kill itself. In the 18th century, Bretons had a taboo against calling the salamander by its true name, for fear people would come to harm if the creature heard it.

A legend from Lausitz recorded in German tells of a sorcerer who kept a salamander sealed in bottle but could be unleashed on his enemies. While the magician was staying at Lauban, the broom maid's daughter tampered with the bottle and released the salamander. The spirit announced his gratitude to the townsfolk, and thereafter would warn them of an outbreak of fire by flying above the house in danger in the guise of a pyramid and serpent, and came to be called Feuerpuhz, a name that alludes to blowing of air, or swooshing out of a bottle.

== Asia ==
According to the sixteenth century Chinese pharmacopoeic treatise Bencao Gangmu, the Chinese "salamander" (actually the huoshu 火鼠 "fire-rat") grew long hair that could be woven into cloth which was unharmed by fire and could be cleaned by burning, hence called huo huan bu (火浣布 "cloths washed with fire" or "fire-laundered cloth"). The work is a compilation of past works, many ancient, and though its entry for the "fire rat" does not clarify its sources, similar description of the fire-laundered cloth could be found in Ge Hong's (Note: Ge Hong romanized as "Ko Hung" in the old style.) Baopuzi (4th century): both works claim such fireproof cloth could be made from both animal hair and plant material. Ge Hong's Chinese account of the "fire rat" is characterized as a "disguise of the classical salamander" by Berthold Laufer.

=== Transmission of salamander-asbestos cloth lore ===
Laufer notes that Arab or Persian writers gave a mixed description of their versions of the salamandar, written samandal or samandar, sometimes as a bird or phoenix, but also as a marten-like animal, said to yield cloth which can be laundered in fire, similar to Chinese lore. Such description of "samandar" as marten-like and yielding incombustible cloth was attested by the writer (Lutfullah Halimi, d. 1516) cited by d'Herbelot and (as "samandal") by al-Damiri (d. 1415). As for the commingling of the creature with the bird-kind, the Yaqut al-Hamawi (d. 1229) recorded the popular belief that asbestos came from phoenix feathers, and this is echoed by the European notion of asbestos as "salamander's plumage".

Laufer was convinced such Arab lore had been transmitted into Europe in the 10th or 11th century, via Byzantium and Spain (though the Arab literature he cited above did not date so far back). The earliest attestation in medieval Europe of associating the salamander with an unburnable cloth occurs in the Provençal Naturas d'alcus auzels (13th century) according to Laufer. Also the German scholar Albertus Magnus had called the incombustible cloth pluma salamandri ("salamander's plumage") in his work. (Note: Henry Yule's note.)

Some commentators also vaguely ascribe the introduction into Europe via early travellers to China were shown garments supposedly woven from such "salamander's" hair or wool. Such garments were, of course, actually made of asbestos cloth.

According to T. H. White, Prester John had a robe made from it; the "Emperor of India" possessed a suit made from a thousand skins; and Pope Alexander III had a tunic which he valued highly. William Caxton (1481) wrote: "This Salemandre berithe wulle, of which is made cloth and gyrdles that may not brenne in the fyre."

Randle Holme III (1688) wrote: "...I have several times put [salamander hair] in the Fire and made it red hot and after taken it out, which being cold, yet remained perfect wool".

An alternative interpretation was that this material was a kind of silk: A 12th-century letter supposedly from Prester John says, "Our realm yields the worm known as the salamander. Salamanders live in fire and make cocoons, which our court ladies spin and use to weave cloth and garments. To wash and clean these fabrics, they throw them into flames". Marco Polo still employed the term "salamander" but recognized this was no creature, but rather an incombustible substance mined from earth, and had visited the production site.

== Eponymy ==
The beast's ability to withstand fire has led to its name being applied to a variety of heating devices, including space heaters, ovens and cooking and blacksmithing devices, dating back at least to the 17th century.

== See also ==
- Chasing the dragon
- Gnome
- Kumbhanda
- Lurchi
- Sylph

== Bibliography ==
- Crump, Marty (2015-11-16). Eye of Newt and Toe of Frog, Adder's Fork and Lizard's Leg: The Lore and Mythology of Amphibians and Reptiles. University of Chicago Press. ISBN 978-0-226-11614-3.
- Hall, Manly P. (1928). "The Elements and Their Inhabitants". The Secret Teachings of All Ages: An Encyclopedic Outline of Masonic, Hermetic, Qabbalistic and Rosicrucian Symbolical Philosophy. San Francisco: H. S. Crocker – via sacred-texts.com/Evinity Publishing.
  - -- (1928); edited for the web by Mario Lampié (2009), pp. 319ff via Internet Archive.
- Hillman, D. C. A. (2001). "The Salamander as a Drug in Nicander's Writings". Pharmacy in History. 43 (2/3): 93–96. JSTOR 41112052.
- Laufer, Berthold (1915). "Asbestos and Salamander: An essay in Chinese and Hellenistic Folk-lore". T'oung Pao, ou Archives concernant l'histoire, les langues, la géographie et l'éthnographie de l'Asie orientale 通報. 16: 299–373.
- Needham, Joseph (1959). "Asbestos". Science and Civilisation in China: Volume 3, Mathematics and the Sciences of the Heavens and the Earth. Cambridge University Press. pp. 655–. ISBN 9780521058018.
- Paracelsus (1996) [1941]. "IV. A Book on Nymphs, Sylphs, Pygmies, and Salamanders, and on the Other Spirits". Four Treatises of Theophrastus Von Hohenheim Called Paracelsus. Translated by Sigerist, Henry. Johns Hopkins University Press. pp. 213–255. ISBN 9780801855238.
- Slifkin, Nosson (2007). Sacred Monsters: Mysterious and Mythical Creatures of Scripture, Talmud and Midrash. Zoo Torah. pp. 287–. ISBN 9781933143187.
- Wallace, Ella Faye (October 2018). The Sorcerer's Pharmacy (Ph. D.). New Brunswick, New Jersey: Rutgers University. p. 44.
