= Bestiary =

Compendium of beasts

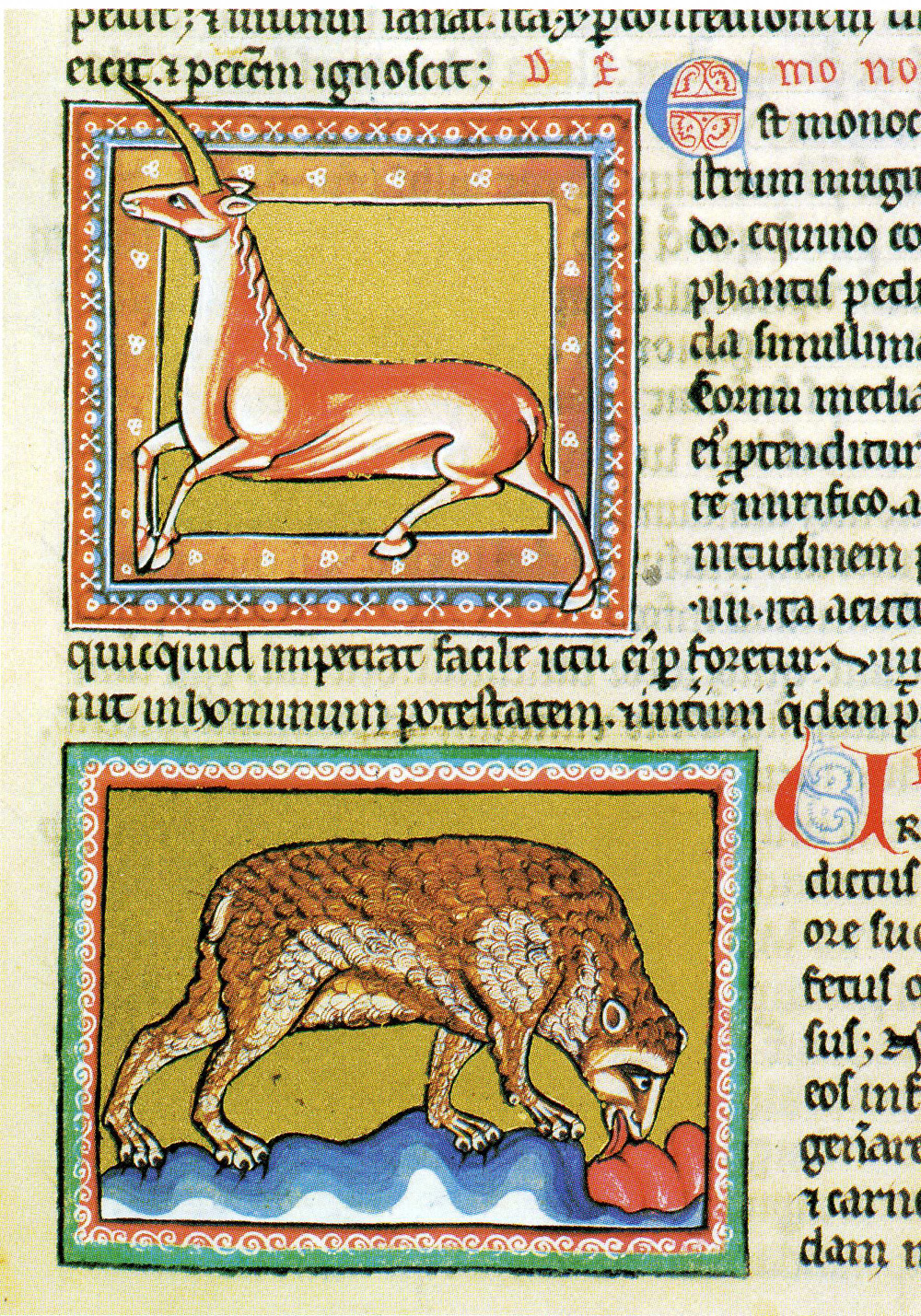
Monoceros and Bear. Bodleian Library, MS. Ashmole 1511, The Ashmole Bestiary, Folio 21r, England (Peterborough?), Early 13th century.

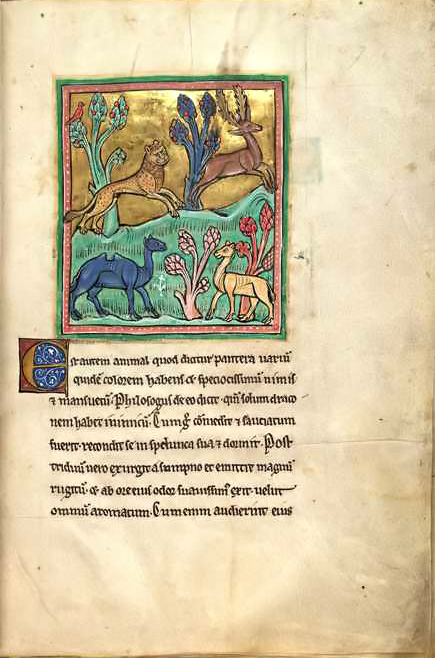
"The Leopard" from the 13th-century bestiary known as the "Rochester Bestiary"

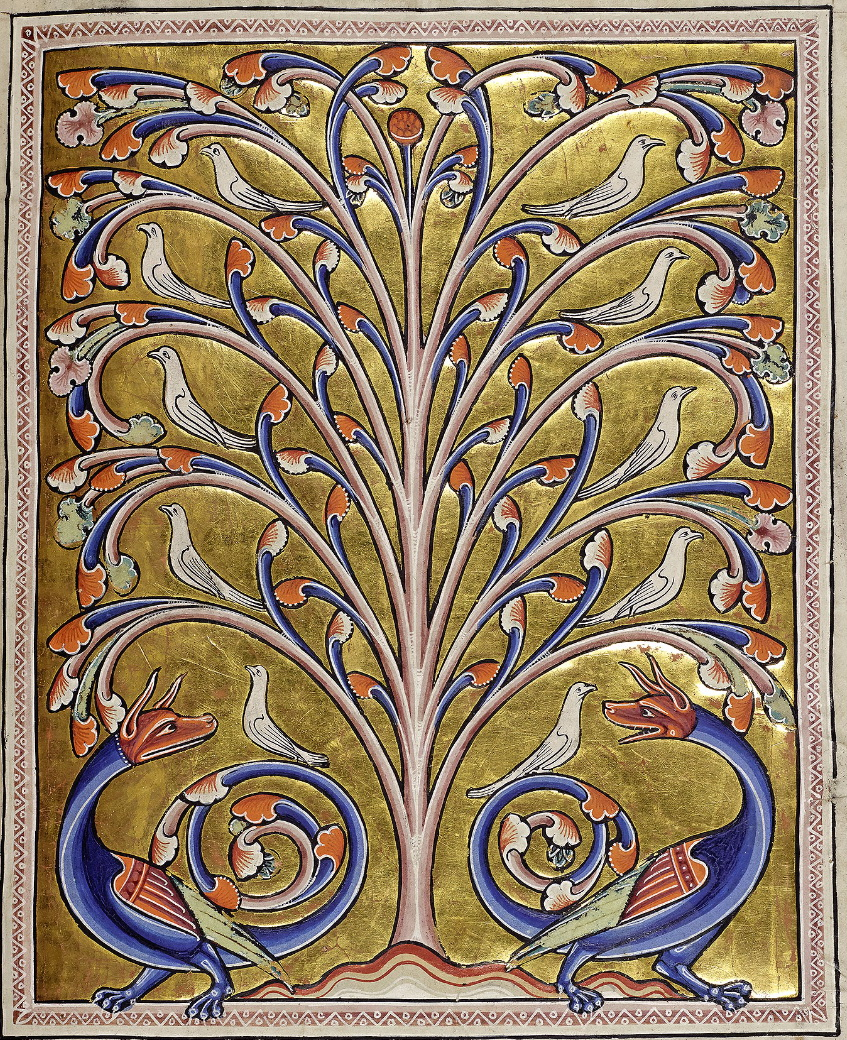
The Peridexion Tree

A bestiary (Latin: bestiarium vocabulum) is a compendium of beasts. Originating in the ancient world, bestiaries were made popular in the Middle Ages in illustrated volumes that described various animals and even rocks. The natural history and illustration of each beast was usually accompanied by a moral lesson. This reflected the belief that the world itself was the Word of God and that every living thing had its own special meaning. For example, the pelican, which was believed to tear open its breast to bring its young to life with its own blood, was a living representation of Jesus. Thus the bestiary is also a reference to the symbolic language of animals in Western Christian art and literature.

== History ==
The bestiary — the medieval book of beasts — was among the most popular illuminated texts in northern Europe during the Middle Ages (about 500–1500). Medieval Christians understood every element of the world as a manifestation of God, and bestiaries largely focused on each animal's religious meaning. Much of what is in the bestiary came from the ancient Greeks and their philosophers. The earliest bestiary in the form in which it was later popularized was an anonymous 2nd-century Greek volume called the Physiologus, which itself summarized ancient knowledge and wisdom about animals in the writings of classical authors such as Aristotle's Historia Animalium and various works by Herodotus, Pliny the Elder, Solinus, Aelian and other naturalists.

Following the Physiologus, Saint Isidore of Seville (Book XII of the Etymologiae) and Saint Ambrose expanded the religious message with reference to passages from the Bible and the Septuagint. They and other authors freely expanded or modified pre-existing models, constantly refining the moral content without interest in or access to much more detail regarding the factual content. Nevertheless, the often fanciful accounts of these beasts were widely read and generally believed to be true. A few observations found in bestiaries, such as the migration of birds, were discounted by the natural philosophers of later centuries, only to be rediscovered in the modern scientific era.

Medieval bestiaries are remarkably similar to one another in sequence of the animals of which they treat. Bestiaries were particularly popular in England and France around the 12th century and were mainly compilations of earlier texts. The Aberdeen Bestiary is one of the best known of over 50 manuscript bestiaries surviving today.

Much influence comes from the Renaissance era and the general Middle Ages, as well as modern times. The Renaissance has been said to have started around the 14th century in Italy. Bestiaries influenced early heraldry in the Middle Ages, giving ideas for charges and also for the artistic form. Bestiaries continue to give inspiration to coats of arms created in our time.

Two illuminated Psalters, the Queen Mary Psalter (British Library Ms. Royal 2B, vii) and the Isabella Psalter (State Library, Munich), contain full Bestiary cycles. The bestiary in the Queen Mary Psalter is found in the "marginal" decorations that occupy about the bottom quarter of the page, and are unusually extensive and coherent in this work. In fact the bestiary has been expanded beyond the source in the Norman bestiary of Guillaume le Clerc to ninety animals. Some are placed in the text to make correspondences with the psalm they are illustrating.

Many decide to make their own bestiary with their own observations including knowledge from previous ones. These observations can be made in text form, as well as illustrated out. The Italian artist Leonardo da Vinci also made his own bestiary.

A volucrary is a similar collection of the symbols of birds that is sometimes found in conjunction with bestiaries. The most widely known volucrary in the Renaissance was Johannes de Cuba's Gart der Gesundheit which describes 122 birds and which was printed in 1485.

== Bestiary content ==
The contents of medieval bestiaries were often obtained and created from combining older textual sources and accounts of animals, such as the Physiologus.

Medieval bestiaries contained detailed descriptions and illustrations of species native to Western Europe, exotic animals and what in modern times are considered to be imaginary animals. Descriptions of the animals included the physical characteristics associated with the creature, although these were often physiologically incorrect, along with the Christian morals that the animal represented. The description was then often accompanied by an artistic illustration of the animal as described in the bestiary. For example, in one bestiary the eagle is depicted in an illustration and is said to be the “king of birds.”

Bestiaries were organized in different ways based upon the sources they drew upon. The descriptions could be organized by animal groupings, such as terrestrial and marine creatures, or presented in an alphabetical manner. However, the texts gave no distinction between existing and imaginary animals. Descriptions of creatures such as dragons, unicorns, basilisk, griffin and caladrius were common in such works and found intermingled amongst accounts of bears, boars, deer, lions, and elephants. In one source, the author explains how fables and bestiaries are closely linked to one another as “each chapter of a bestiary, each fable in a collection, has a text and has a meaning.

This lack of separation has often been associated with the assumption that people during this time believed in what the modern period classifies as nonexistent or "imaginary creatures". However, this assumption is currently under debate, with various explanations being offered. Some scholars, such as Pamela Gravestock, have written on the theory that medieval people did not actually think such creatures existed but instead focused on the belief in the importance of the Christian morals these creatures represented, and that the importance of the moral did not change regardless if the animal existed or not. The historian of science David C. Lindberg pointed out that medieval bestiaries were rich in symbolism and allegory, so as to teach moral lessons and entertain, rather than to convey knowledge of the natural world.

== Religious significance ==
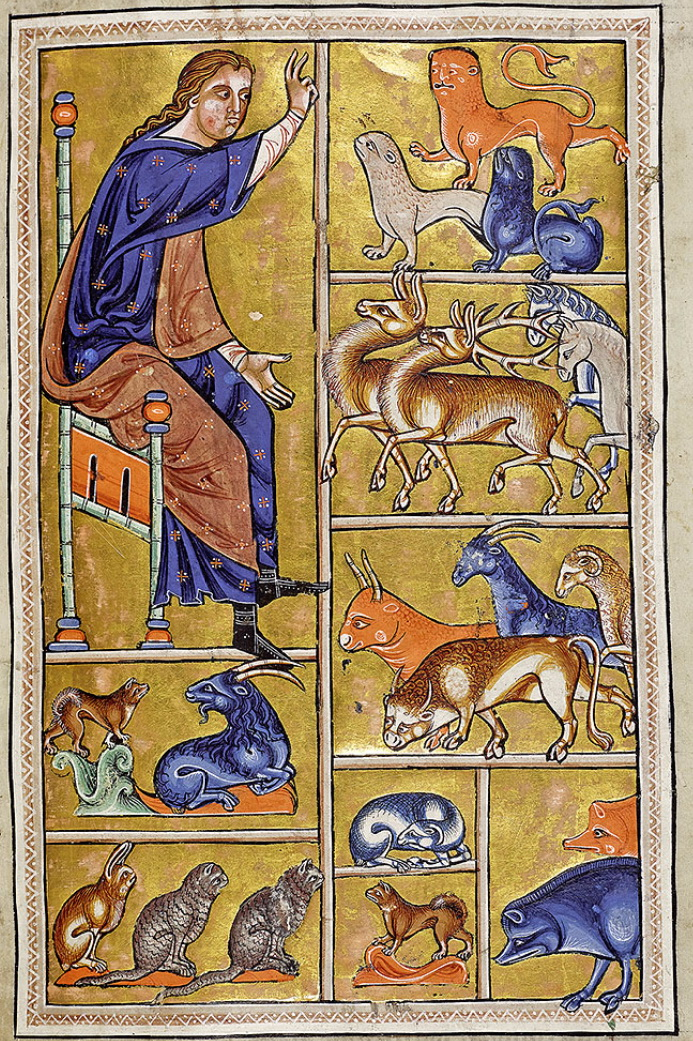
Adam naming the animals, in a detail from the 12th century Aberdeen Bestiary

The significance shown between animals and religion started much before bestiaries came into play. In many ancient civilizations there are references to animals and their meaning within that specific religion or mythology that we know of today. These civilizations included Egypt and their gods with the faces of animals or Greece which had symbolic animals for their godly beings, an example being Zeus and the eagle. With animals being a part of religion before bestiaries and their lessons came out, they were influenced by past observations of meaning as well as older civilizations and their interpretations. The Physiologus though was the direct antecedent to the bestiary, for this 2nd to 3rd century CE text likewise catalogs animals and invests them with a moralizing narrative.

The audience for bestiaries was not only monks and clerics, but also laity. All of the animals presented in the bestiaries show some sort of lesson or meaning when presented. A few of the creatures, such as the pelican, panther and lion are unequivocally "good," and in contrast the dragon is an evil, Satanic creature (appearing in the pelican entry as well for its fear of the panther's sweet breath, an allegory of good's power over evil).

These bestiaries held much content in terms of religious significance. In almost every animal there is some way to connect it to a lesson from the church or a familiar religious story. With animals holding significance since ancient times, it is fair to say that bestiaries and their contents gave fuel to the context behind the animals, whether real or myth, and their meanings.

== Modern bestiaries ==
In modern times, artists such as Henri de Toulouse-Lautrec and Saul Steinberg have produced their own bestiaries. Jorge Luis Borges wrote a contemporary bestiary of sorts, the Book of Imaginary Beings, which collects imaginary beasts from bestiaries and fiction. Nicholas Christopher wrote a literary novel called The Bestiary (Dial, 2007) that describes a lonely young man's efforts to track down the world's most complete bestiary. John Henry Fleming's Fearsome Creatures of Florida (Pocol Press, 2009) borrows from the medieval bestiary tradition to impart moral lessons about the environment. Caspar Henderson's The Book of Barely Imagined Beings (Granta 2012, University of Chicago Press 2013), subtitled "A 21st Century Bestiary", explores how humans imagine animals in a time of rapid environmental change. In July 2014, Jonathan Scott wrote The Blessed Book of Beasts, Eastern Christian Publications, featuring 101 animals from the various translations of the Bible, in keeping with the tradition of the bestiary found in the writings of the Saints, including Saint John Chrysostom. In today's world there is a discipline called cryptozoology which is the study of unknown species. This discipline can be linked to medieval bestiaries because in many cases the unknown animals can be the same, as well as having meaning or significance behind them.

The lists of monsters to be found in video games (such as NetHack, Dragon Quest, and Monster Hunter), as well as some tabletop role-playing games such as Warhammer Fantasy Roleplay, Dungeons & Dragons and Pathfinder, are often termed bestiaries.

== See also ==
- Allegory in the Middle Ages
- List of medieval bestiaries
- Marine counterparts of land creatures
- Animal representation in Western medieval art
