= Marine counterparts of land creatures =

Medieval biology theory

The idea that there are specific marine counterparts to land creatures, inherited from the writers on natural history in Antiquity, was firmly believed in the Arab World and in Medieval Europe. It is exemplified by the creatures represented in the medieval animal encyclopedias called bestiaries, and in the parallels drawn in the moralising attributes attached to each. "The creation was a mathematical diagram drawn in parallel lines," T. H. White said a propos the bestiary he translated. "Things did not only have a moral they often had physical counterparts in other strata. There was a horse in the land and a sea-horse in the sea. For that matter there was probably a Pegasus in heaven". The idea of perfect analogies in the fauna of land and sea was considered part of the perfect symmetry of the Creator's plan, offered as the "book of nature" to mankind, for which a text could be found in Job:

But ask the animals, and they will teach you, or the birds of the air, and they will tell you; or speak to the earth, and it will teach you, or let the fish of the sea inform you. Which of all these does not know that the hand of the Lord has done this? In his hand is the life of every creature and the breath of all mankind.

The idea appears in the Jewish Tannaic sources as well, as brought down in the Babylonian Talmud, Chulin 127a. Rashi (Psalms 49:2) traces this to a biblical source – the land is referred to as "Choled", from the weasel (chulda), because the weasel is the only animal on dry land that does not have its counterpart in the sea.

All of Creation was considered to reflect the Creator, and Man could learn about the Creator through studying the Creation, an assumption that underlies the "watchmaker analogy" offered as proof of God's existence.

The correspondence between the realms of earth and sea, extending to their denizens, offers examples of the taste for allegory engendered by Christian and Islamic methods of exegesis, which also encouraged the doctrine of signatures, a "key" to the meaning and use of herbs.

The source text that was most influential in compiling the bestiaries of the 12th and 13th centuries was the Physiologus, one of the most widely read and copied secular texts of the Middle Ages. Written in Greek in Alexandria the 2nd century CE and accumulating further "exemplary" beasts in the next three centuries and more, Physiologus was transmitted in the West in Latin, and eventually translated into many vernacular languages: many manuscripts in various languages survive. Aelian, On the Characteristics of Animals (A. F. Scholfield, in Loeb Classical Library, 1958).

Christian writers, trained in anagogical thinking and expecting to find spiritual instruction inherent in the processes of Nature, disregarded the caveat in Pliny's Natural History, where the idea is presented as a "vulgar opinion":

Hence it is that the vulgar notion may very possibly be true, that whatever is produced in any other department of Nature, is to be found in the sea as well; while, at the same time, many other productions are there to be found which nowhere else exist. That there are to be found in the sea the forms, not only of terrestrial animals, but of inanimate objects even, is easily to be understood by all who will take the trouble to examine the grape-fish, the sword-fish, the sawfish, and the cucumber-fish, which last so strongly resembles the real cucumber both in colour and in smell.

Pliny points out that many more things are found in the sea than on the land, and also mentions the correspondences that may be discovered between many non-living objects of the land and living creatures in the sea.

Saint Augustine of Hippo reasons based on analogy, that since there is a serpent in the grass, there must be an eel in the sea; because there is a Leviathan in the sea, there must be a Behemoth on the land. (City of God? xi.15?)

The reaction to such anagogical thinking set in with the unfolding of critical scientific thought in the 17th century. Sir Thomas Browne devoted a chapter of his Pseudodoxia Epidemica to dispelling such a belief: Chapter XXIV: "That all Animals in the land are in their kinde in the Sea." During the Enlightenment the ancient conception was given an innovative and rationalized cast by Benoît de Maillet in describing the transformations and metamorphoses undergone by creatures of the sea to render them fit for life on land, a proto-evolutionist concept, though it was based on superficial morphological similarities:

There are in the Sea, Fish of almost all the Figures of Land-Animals, and even of Birds. She includes Plants, Flowers, and some Fruits; the Nettle, the Rose, the Pink, the Melon and the Grape, are to be found there.

As for the Quadrupeds, we not only find in the Sea, Species of the same Figure and Inclinations, and in the Waves living on the same Aliments by which they are nourished on Land, we have also Examples of those Species living equally in the Air and in the Water. Have not the Sea-Apes precisely the same figure with those of the Land?

Though in Moby-Dick Ishmael, with a nod to Sir Thomas Browne's wording, denies the claim that land animals find their counterparts in the sea:

For though some old naturalists have maintained that all creatures of the land are of their kind in the sea; and though taking a broad general view of the thing, this may very well be; yet coming to specialties, where, for example, does the ocean furnish any fish that in disposition answers to the sagacious kindness of the dog? The accursed shark alone can in any generic respect be said to bear comparative analogy to him.

In discussing dolphins trained to aid scuba divers, a 1967 Popular Mechanics article could still casually state: "It's hoped that the marine counterparts of some land animals can be trained to become useful members of the Man-in-the-Sea program."
