= Isabella Psalter =

14th-century manuscript

Isabelle Psalter
- Psalter of Queen Isabella
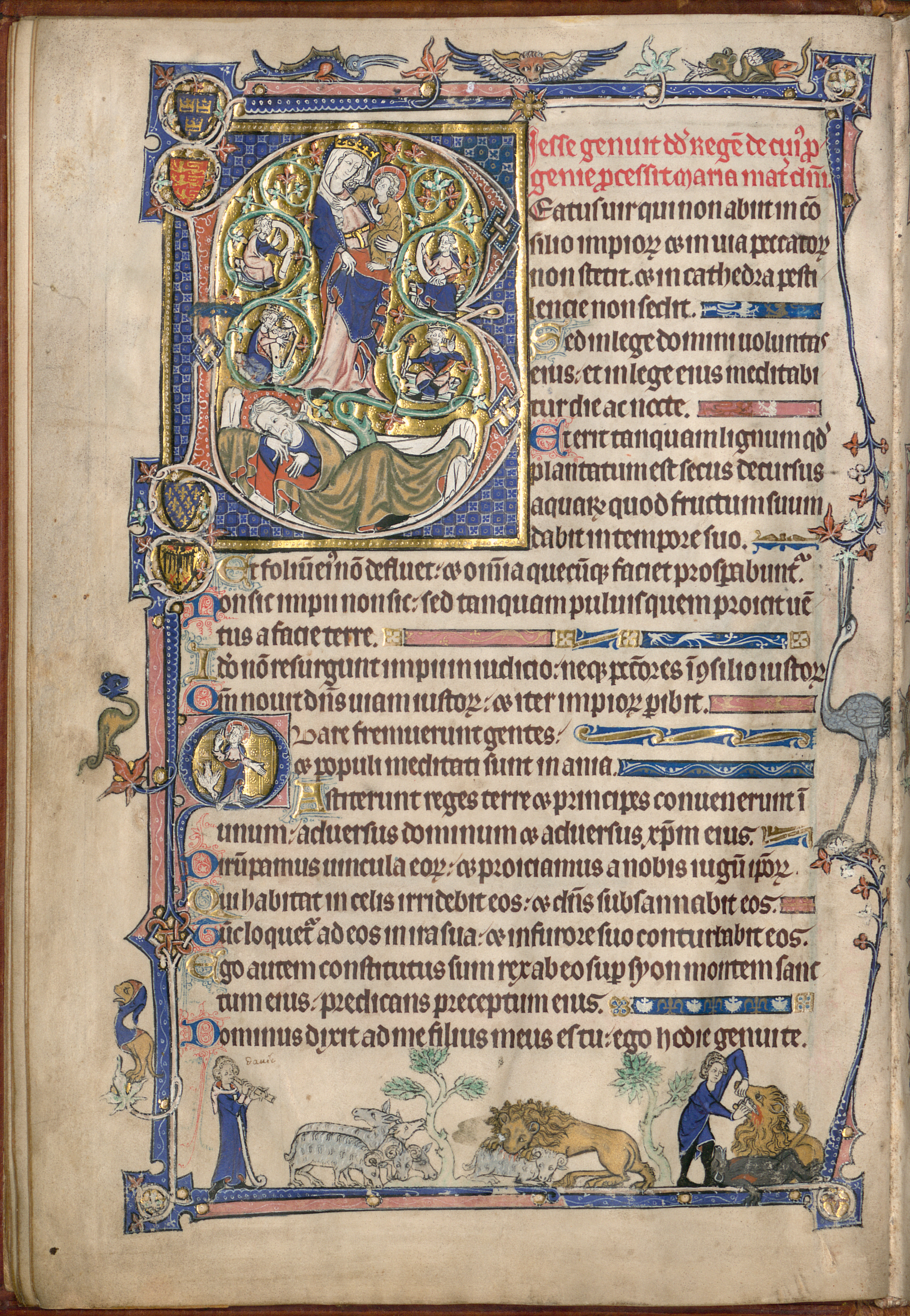
- Beginning of the Psalter, with initial representing the Tree of Jesse
- Illustrated by: Anonymous
- Audience: Isabella of France
- Language: Latin and Old French
- Date: c. 1303–1308
- State of existence: Incomplete
- Manuscript(s): BSB Cod.gall. 16
- Genre: Psalter
- Length: 131 remaining folios, originally ≥150
- Sources: Vulgate

The Isabella Psalter (BSB Cod.gall. 16), also called the Psalter of Queen Isabella or the Psalter of Isabella of England, is a 14th-century volume containing the Book of Psalms, named for Isabella of France, who is herself depicted in it; it was likely a gift upon her betrothal or marriage. The illuminated manuscript is also notable for its bestiary.

== Origin and history of the manuscript ==
The psalter was produced ca. 1303–1308. Like its "closest relation," the Tickhill Psalter, it shows a French influence and is similar in content and style to the Queen Mary Psalter and the Ormesby Psalter. Like the Queen Mary and Tickhill psalters, and like the Egerton Gospel and the Holkham Picture Bible, some of its captions and illustrations can be traced to the 12th-century Historia scholastica; all these 14th-century manuscripts may have "a thirteenth-century Parisian antecedent, reflected in the Tours Genesis window" (in reference to a window in the clerestory of the Tours Cathedral). It is currently held in the Bavarian State Library, Munich.

According to Donald Drew Egbert, the illuminators belong to the same group that illuminated the Tickhill Psalter. Art historian Ellen Beer, however, states that while there are similarities, Egbert is too quick to identify the illuminators (whom he connects to four other manuscripts as well). According to Beer, two of the illuminators responsible for the Psalter of St. Louis can be recognized in the Isabella Psalter.

== Description ==
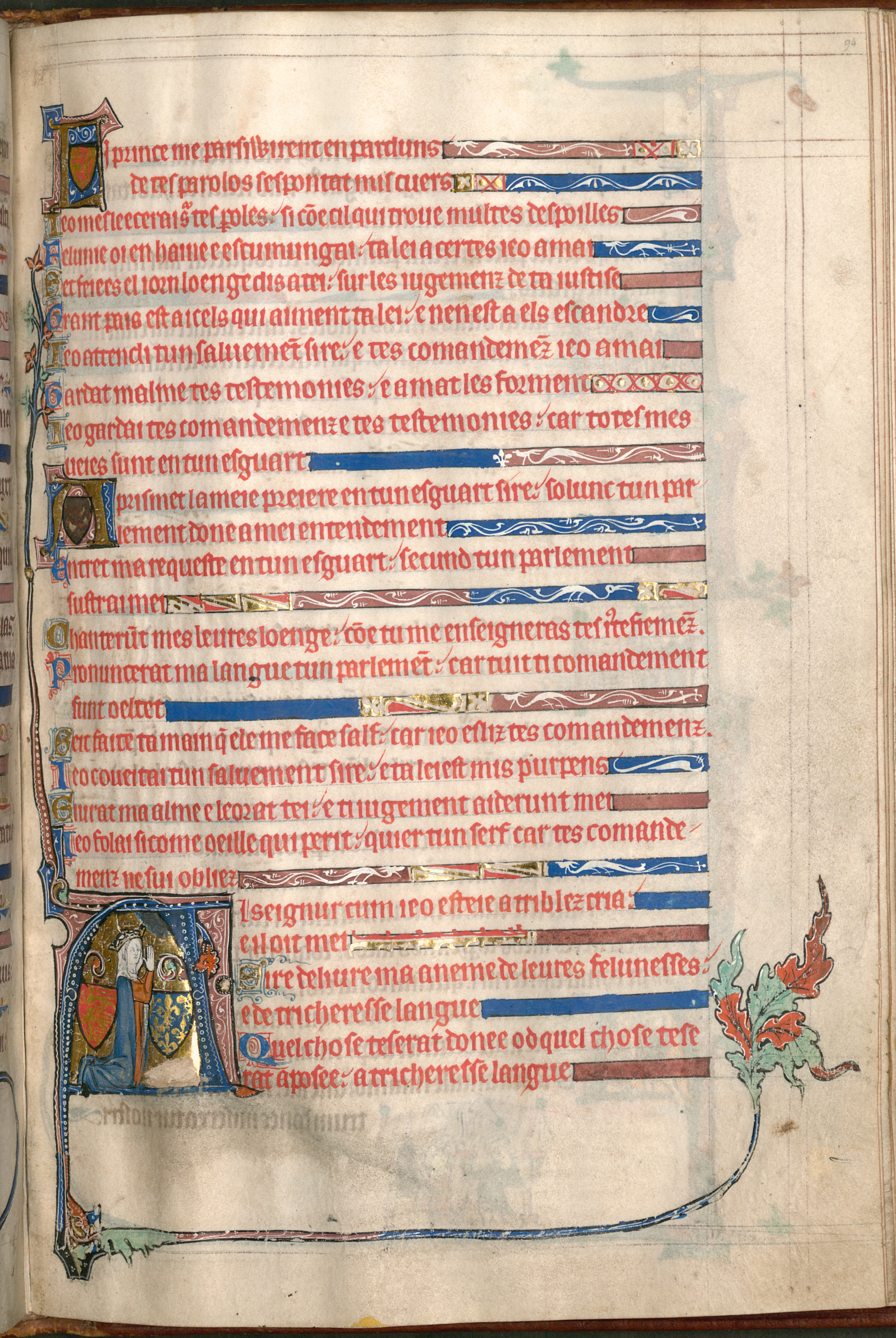
In the initial of Psalm 120, Isabella of France is depicted praying, flanked by the coats of arms of England and France

The manuscript contains 131 leaves of parchment, and is missing 19 leaves which were separated from the codex at an unknown time. It is a parallel text, with each Psalm appearing in both Latin and Old French. The left-hand pages contain Latin text in black ink, and the right-hand pages contain French text in red ink. The beginning of each principle section of the psalter is marked by a large illuminated initial and marginal scenes from the life of King David. Of the twenty incipit pages originally included in the book, only nine remain. The Latin pages are decorated with 238 initials and marginalia illustrating scenes from the Old Testament, in the style of contemporary Bibles moralisées. The French pages are adorned with initials in the form of heraldic blazons throughout, and a bestiary for the first 77 Psalms. Certain animals appear to be associated with particular Psalms, and evoke the moral qualities which the book elevates. The association between Psalms and animals is unusual in medieval texts, and only otherwise appears in the Mary Queen Psalter.

The other distinctive characteristic of the manuscript's iconography is its emphasis on women and their role in the family; the Tree of Jesse, for example, serves as a reminder of Jesus's descent from David by way of Mary. The illustrations related to David focus especially on his wives and concubines, and the other Old Testament images have a similar bent, depicting the marriage of Moses to Tharbis and of Salmon to Rahab, as well as the births of Cain and Samson. Eight scenes are dedicated to Hagar, the concubine of Abraham, and six to the upbringing of Samuel by Hannah.
