= Salamander heater =

Portable heater

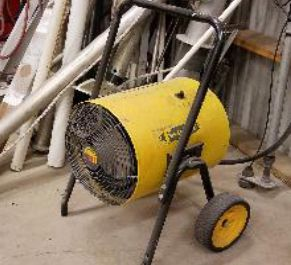
Salamander heater

A salamander heater is any of a variety of portable forced-air or convection space heaters, often using kerosene or propane as fuel but also requiring electricity, used in ventilated areas for worksite comfort. Salamander heaters are most often found at construction sites. Depending on style, they can also be referred to as "torpedo furnaces", "salamander furnaces", or simply, "salamanders".

Salamander heaters date back to at least 1915. In the early 1940s, W.L. Scheu of Scheu Manufacturing Company, a producer of temporary portable space heating equipment, developed the modern salamander heater to provide warmth to allow construction crews to work in inclement weather. Sales spread across the US, and by the 1950s, to Europe.

== Name ==
The name, also applied to various types of heating device, comes from the mythical salamander, a beast that lived in fire and could control fire. Examples from kitchen use include high temperature ovens and, from the 17th and 18th century, a browning element.
