= Physiologus =

Didactic Christian text

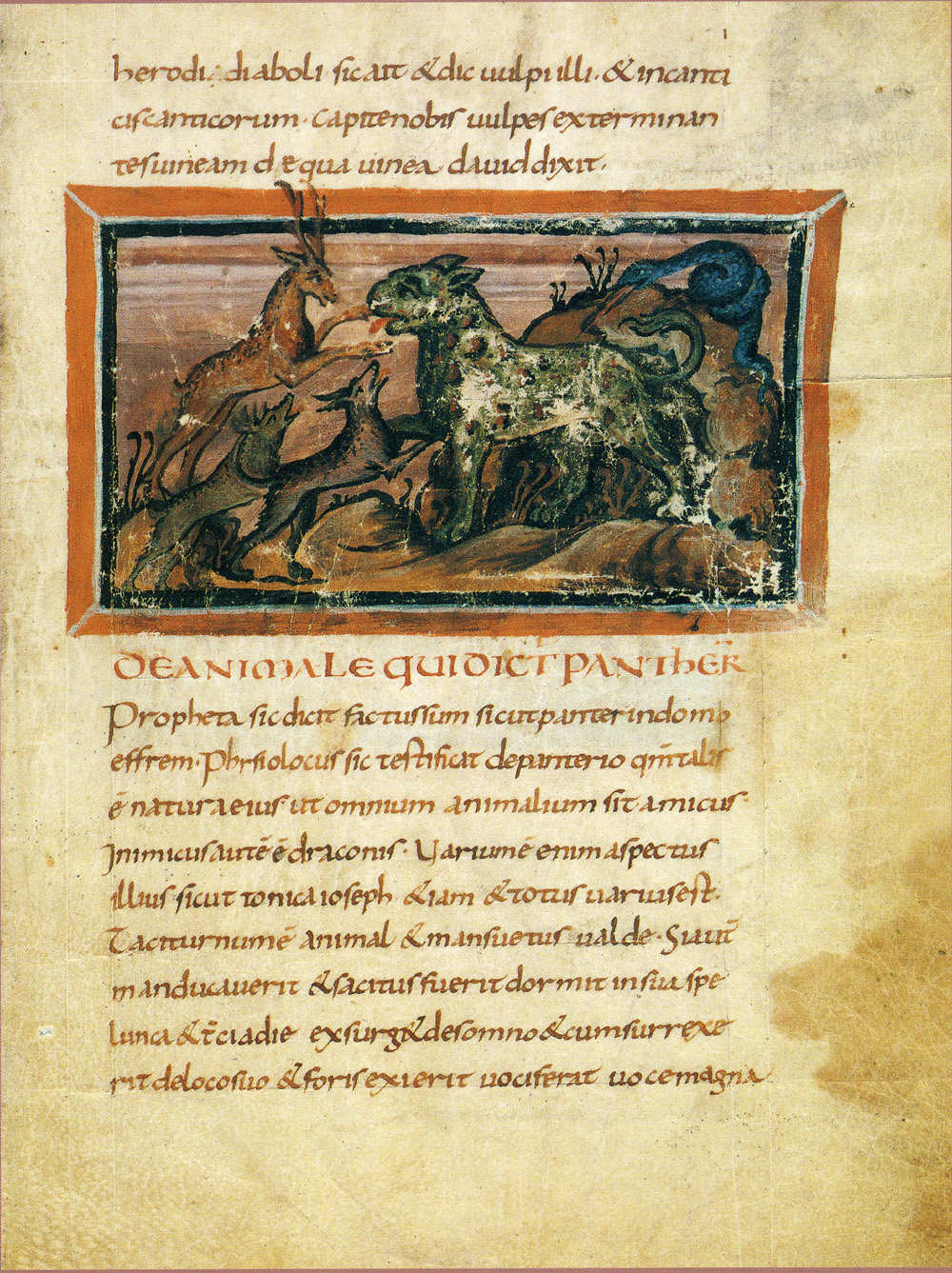
Panther, Bern Physiologus, 9th century

The Physiologus (Greek: Φυσιολόγος) is a didactic Christian text written or compiled in Greek by an unknown author in Alexandria. Its composition has been traditionally dated to the 2nd century AD by readers who saw parallels with writings of Clement of Alexandria, who is asserted to have known the text, though Alan Scott has made a case for a date at the end of the 3rd or in the 4th century. The Physiologus consists of descriptions of animals, birds, and fantastic creatures, sometimes stones and plants, provided with moral content. Each animal is described, and an anecdote follows, from which the moral and symbolic qualities of the animal are derived. Manuscripts are often, but not always, given illustrations, often lavish.

The book was translated into Armenian in 5th century, into Latin by the early 6th century or possibly even by the mid-4th century and into Ethiopic and Syriac, then into many European and Middle-Eastern languages, and many illuminated manuscript copies such as the Bern Physiologus survive. It retained its influence over ideas of the "meaning" of animals in Europe for over a thousand years. It was a predecessor of bestiaries (books of beasts). Medieval poetical literature is full of allusions that can be traced to the Physiologus tradition; the text also exerted great influence on the symbolism of medieval ecclesiastical art: symbols like those of the phoenix rising from its ashes and the pelican feeding her young with her own blood are still well-known.

== Allegorical stories ==
The story is told of the lion whose cubs are born dead and receive life when the old lion breathes upon them, and of the phoenix which burns itself to death and rises on the third day from the ashes; both are taken as types of Christ. The unicorn also which only permits itself to be captured in the lap of a pure virgin is a type of the Incarnation; the pelican that sheds its own blood in order to sprinkle its dead young, so that they may live again, is a type of the salvation of mankind by the death of Christ on the Cross. This motif is known as the Pelican in her Piety.

Some allegories set forth the deceptive enticements of the Devil and his defeat by Christ; others present qualities as examples to be imitated or avoided.

== Attributions ==
The conventional title Physiologus was because the author introduces his stories from natural history with the phrase: "the physiologus says", that is, "the naturalist says", "the natural philosophers, the authorities for natural history say," a term derived from Greek φύσις (physis, "nature") and λόγος (logos, “word”).

In later centuries it was ascribed to various celebrated Fathers, especially Epiphanius, Basil of Caesarea, and St. Peter of Alexandria.

The assertion that the method of the Physiologus presupposes the allegorical exegesis developed by Origen is not correct; the so-called Letter of Barnabas offers, before Origen, a sufficient model, not only for the general character of the Physiologus but also for many of its details. It can hardly be asserted that the later recensions, in which the Greek text has been preserved, present even in the best and oldest manuscripts a perfectly reliable transcription of the original, especially as this was an anonymous and popular treatise.

== Early history ==
About the year 400 the Physiologus was translated from Greek into Latin. In the 5th century into Ethiopic [edited by Fritz Hommel with a German translation (Leipzig, 1877), revised German translation in Romanische Forschungen, V, 13–36]; into Armenian [edited by Pitra in Spicilegium Solesmense, III, 374–90; French translation by Cahier in Nouveaux Mélanges d'archéologie, d'histoire et de littérature (Paris, 1874)] (see also the recent edition: Gohar Muradyan, Physiologus. The Greek And Armenian Versions With a Study of Translation Technique, Leuven–Dudley MA: Peeters, 2005 [Hebrew University Armenian Studies 6]); into Syriac [edited by Tychsen, Physiologus Syrus (Rostock, 1795), a later Syriac and an Arabic version edited by Land in Anecdota Syriaca, IV (Leyden, 1875)]. An Old Slavic (Old Bulgarian) translation was made in the 10th century [edited by Karneyev, Materialy i zametki po literaturnoj istorii Fiziologa, Sankt Peterburg, 1890].

Epiphanius used Physiologus in his Panarion and from his time numerous further quotations and references to the Physiologus in the Greek and the Latin Church Fathers show that it was one of the most generally known works of Christian Late Antiquity. Various translations and revisions were current in the Middle Ages. The earliest translation into Latin was followed by various recensions, among them the Sayings of St. John Chrysostom on the natures of beasts, A metrical Latin Physiologus was written in the 11th century by a certain Theobaldus, and printed by Morris in An Old English Miscellany (1872), 201 sqq.; it also appears among the works of Hildebertus Cenomanensis in Pat.Lat., CLXXI, 1217–24. To these should be added the literature of the bestiaries, in which the material of the Physiologus was used; the Tractatus de bestiis et alius rebus, often misattributed to Hugo of St. Victor, and the Speculum naturale of Vincent of Beauvais.

== Translations ==
The Physiologus had an impact on neighboring literatures: medieval translations into Latin, Armenian, Georgian, Slavic, Syriac, Coptic, and Ethiopic are known.

Translations and adaptations from the Latin introduced the "Physiologus" into almost all the languages of Western Europe. An Old High German (Alemannic) translation was written in Hirsau in c. 1070 (ed. Müllenhoff and Scherer in Denkmäler deutscher Poesie und Prosa No. LXXXI); a later translation (12th century) has been edited by Friedrich Lauchert in Geschichte des Physiologus (pp. 280–99); and a rhymed version appears in Karajan, Deutsche Sprachdenkmale des XII. Jahrhunderts (pp. 73–106), both based on the Latin text known as Dicta Chrysostomi. Fragments of a 9th-century metrical Anglo-Saxon Physiologus are extant (ed. Thorpe in Codex Exoniensis pp. 335–67, Grein in Bibliothek der angelsächsischen Poesie I, 223–8).

About the middle of the 13th century there appeared a Middle English metrical Bestiary, an adaptation of the Latin Physiologus Theobaldi; this has been edited by Wright and Halliwell in Reliquiæ antiquæ (I, 208–27), also by Morris in An Old English Miscellany (1–25). There is an Icelandic Physiologus preserved in two fragmentary redactions from around 1200.

In the 12th and 13th centuries there appeared the Bestiaires of Philippe de Thaun, a metrical Old French version, edited by Thomas Wright in Popular Treatises on Science Written during the Middle Ages (74–131), and by Walberg (Lund and Paris, 1900); that by Guillaume, clerk of Normandy, called Bestiare divin, and edited by Cahier in his Mélanges d'archéologie (II–IV), also edited by Hippeau (Caen, 1852), and by Reinsch (Leipzig, 1890); the Bestiare de Gervaise, edited by Paul Meyer in Romania (I, 420–42); the Bestiare in prose of Pierre le Picard, edited by Cahier in Mélanges (II–IV).

An adaptation is found in the old Waldensian literature, and has been edited by Alfons Mayer in Romanische Forschungen (V, 392 sqq.). As to the Italian bestiaries, a Tuscan-Venetian Bestiarius has been edited (Goldstaub and Wendriner, Ein tosco-venezianischer Bestiarius, Halle, 1892). Extracts from the Physiologus in Provençal have been edited by Bartsch, Provenzalisches Lesebuch (162–66). The Physiologus survived in the literatures of Eastern Europe in books on animals written in Middle Greek, among the Slavs to whom it came from the Byzantine (translations of the so-called Byzantinian redaction were made in Middle Bulgarian in the 13th–14th century; they were edited in 2011 by Ana Stoykova in an electronic edition, see reference), and in a Romanian translation from a Slavic original (edited by Moses Gaster with an Italian translation in Archivio glottologico italiano, X, 273–304).

== The manuscript tradition ==
Modern study of Physiologus can be said to have begun with Francesco Sbordone's edition, 1936, which established three traditions in the surviving manuscripts of the text, a "primitive" tradition, a Byzantine one and a pseudo-Basil tradition. Ben Perry showed that a manuscript Sbordone had missed, at the Morgan Library, was the oldest extant Greek version, a late 10th-century manuscript from Grottaferrata. Anna Dorofeeva has argued that the numerous early Latin Physiologus manuscripts can be seen as evidence for an 'encyclopedic drive' amongst early medieval monastic writing centres.

== Contents ==
The order and naming of these section headings pertain to the Curley (1979) translation.

1. We begin first of all by speaking of the Lion
2. On the Antelope
3. On Piroboli Rocks
4. On the Swordfish
5. On the Charadrius
6. On the Pelican
7. On the Owl
8. On the Eagle
9. On the Phoenix
10. On the Hoopoe
11. On the Wild Ass
12. On the Viper
13. On the Serpent
14. On the Ant
15. On the Siren and Ass-Centaur
16. On the Hedgehog
17. On the Ibis
18. On the Fox
19. On the Peridexion Tree and the Doves
20. On the Elephant
21. On Amos the Prophet
22. On the Roe
23. On the Agate-stone
24. On the Oyster-stone and the Pearl
25. On the Adamant-stone
26. On the Other Nature of the Wild Ass and the Monkey
27. On the Indian-stone
28. On the Heron, that is, the Coot
29. On the Fig Tree
30. On the Panther
31. On the Whale, that is, the Aspidoceleon
32. On the Partridge
33. On the Vulture
34. On the Ant-lion
35. On the Weasel
36. On the Unicorn
37. On the Beaver
38. On the Hyena or the Brute
39. On the Niluus
40. On the Echinemon
41. On the Little Crow
42. On the Ostrich
43. On the Turtle-dove
44. On the Swallow
45. On the Stag
46. On the Frog
47. On the lizard, that is, the Salamander
48. On the Magnet
49. On the Adamant-stone
50. On the Doves
51. On the Sun-lizard, that is, the Sun-eel

== See also ==
- List of illuminated manuscripts
- Naturalis Historia
