= Pope's hat =

The pope's hat may refer to:

- Papal tiara, a crown worn by popes from the 8th century to the mid–20th century
- Mitre, the traditional, ceremonial headdress of bishops
- Zucchetto, a small skullcap worn by clerics
- Camauro, made from red wool or velvet with white ermine trim, usually worn during the winter
- Cappello romano, a clerical hat with a wide, circular brim and a rounded crown

== See also ==
- Papal regalia and insignia
- Popehat, a legal blog
