= Johannes de Cuba =

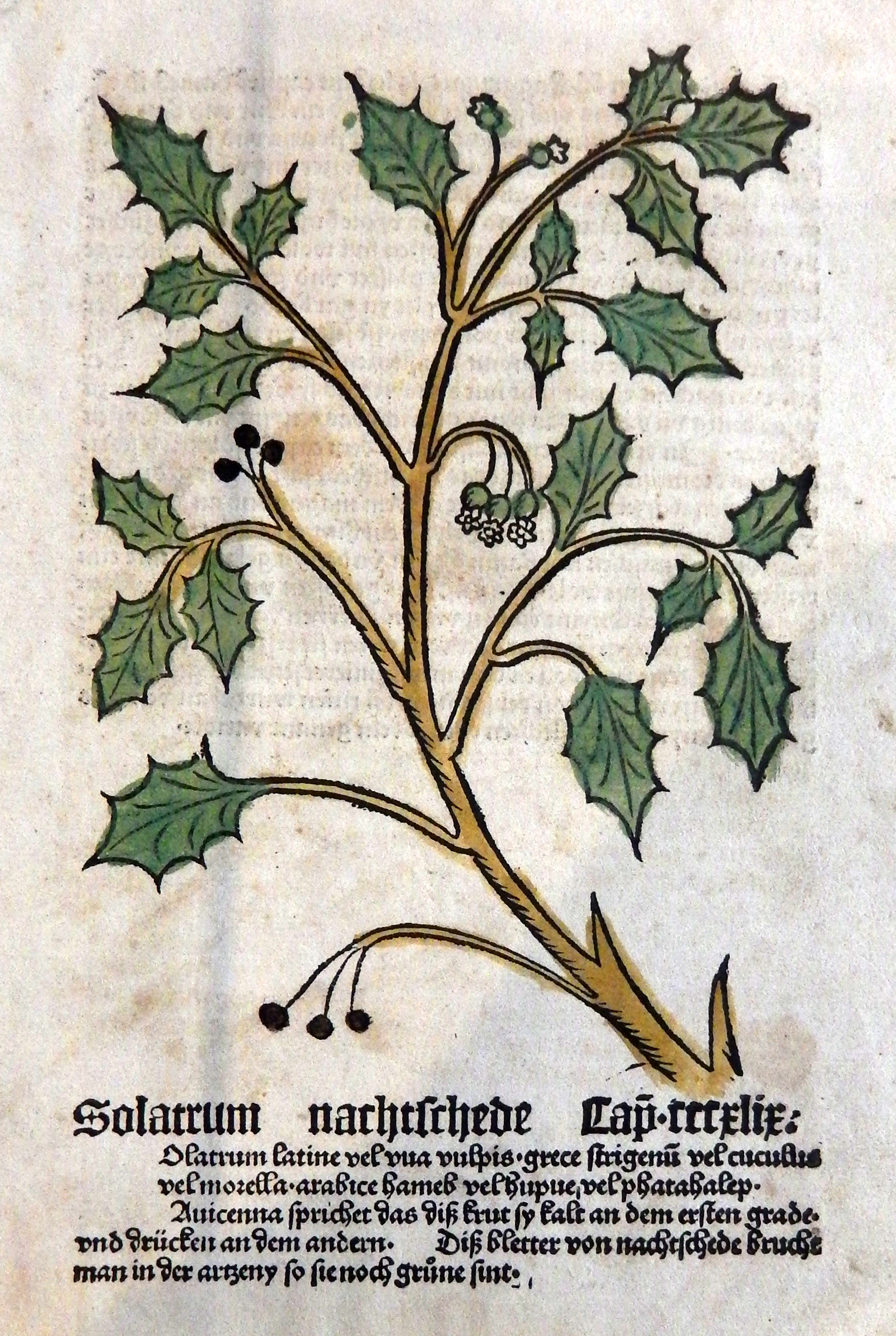
Gart der Gesundheit 1485. Solanum nigrum

Johann von Wonnecke Caub or Johannes de Cuba (c. 1430–1503), is the attributed author of an early printed book on natural history, which was published in Mainz by Peter Schöffer in 1485 under the name of Gart der Gesundheit.
