= Bern Physiologus =

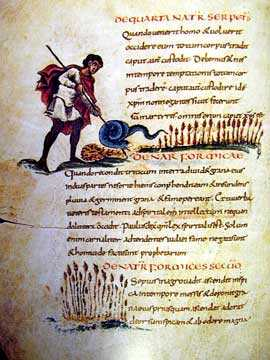
Folio 12v of the Bern Physiologus.

The Bern Physiologus (Bern, Burgerbibliothek, Codex Bongarsianus 318) is a 9th-century illuminated copy of the Latin translation of the Physiologus. It was probably produced at Reims about 825–850. It is believed to be a copy of a 5th-century manuscript. Many of its miniatures are set, unframed, into the text block, which was a characteristic of late-antique manuscripts. It is one of the oldest extant illustrated copies of the Physiologus.
