= Quentin Poulet =

Burgundian priest and scribe

Quentin Poulet (fl. 1477–1506) was a Burgundian Catholic priest, known as a scribe, illuminator, and librarian, from Lille. Between 1492 and at least 1506, when he disappears from the historical record, he was the first recorded librarian of the Old Royal Library of England, and probably "an arbiter of continental taste for the English royal court".

== Life ==
He enrolled as an apprentice in the Confraternity of St John the Evangelist in 1477, in Bruges. It was in Bruges that he learned his craft as book artist. The confraternity was mainly for artists, leading several scholars to think Poulet trained as an illuminator, but other book trades were also represented, and no miniatures have ever been attributed to him.

He was appointed librarian by Henry VII of England in 1492, with other duties including French Secretary. As keeper of the king's library at Sheen Palace (soon after renamed Richmond Palace), he selected French manuscripts as well as printed books by Antoine Vérard. Poulet worked in parallel with Peter Actoris, Stationer to the King, who managed the importations.

Poulet is recorded in 1506, sent to Calais for the king on book business. He was succeeded by William (Guillaume) Faques, or "Giles Duwes".

== Works ==
Poulet introduced into the court of Henry VII the Burgundian mirror for princes L'enseignement de vraie noblesse; the work was already old, and the Yorkist Warwick the Kingmaker had had a copy made in Bruges some thirty years earlier. The manuscript, for which Henry paid Poulet the large amount of £23 plus 10 marks on 26 July 1497, was put together in a transcription of high quality by Poulet, and had some adjustments to the text hinting at its application to Henry's problems with low-born pretenders to the throne. Entitled Imaginacion de vraye noblesse, it employed the lettre bastarde script commonly used in Flanders, and only later coming into use in England. The work itself was given an English version within a couple of years, by John Skelton. The original author has traditionally been given as Guillebert de Lannoy, but it is now argued that the work was by his brother Hugues de Lannoy. In either case, the work has strong associations with Poulet's home city of Lille. The manuscript, now British Library Royal MS 19 C viii, was once seen, together with the Charles d'Orléans MS Royal 16 F ii below, as entirely the product of a workshop of immigrant specialists headed by Poulet at Sheen, and so "key early evidence of the Tudors' revival of English court culture". However it is now thought that Poulet scribed the pages at Sheen – the colophon is dated 30 June 1496 – but then sent them to one of the best Bruges workshops to be decorated, using his contacts there. A similar conclusion is less firm in the cases of some of the miniatures in the Orléans manuscript, one of which appears to depict London accurately.

Either Bernard André or Poulet (considered more likely) compiled the manuscript MS Royal 16 F ii of the poetry written by Charles, Duke of Orléans, long held prisoner in England, at least according to the usual account, in which it was prepared for presentation to Arthur, Prince of Wales; it has been suggested that the editor selected from the poems those that would recommend marriage to the prince. It was given to Prince Arthur in 1501, and passed into the Royal Library, being held at Richmond. However Janet Backhouse has suggested that the manuscript was originally a product of the reign of Edward IV, with the decoration left incomplete on his death, and then with illuminations added around 1500, presumably under Poulet's supervision.
