= Coronation of Henry VIII and Catherine =

1509 coronation in England

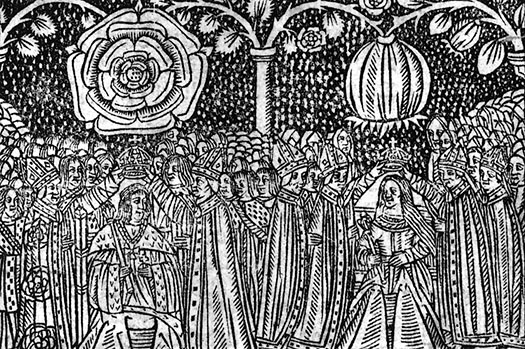
- 16th-century woodcut depicting Henry and Catherine's coronation alongside their respective badges: the Tudor rose and pomegranate of Granada
- Date: 24 June 1509; 516 years ago
- Location: Westminster Abbey, London, England
- Participants: King Henry VIII; Queen Catherine; The Archbishop of Canterbury; Peers of the Realm

The coronation of Henry VIII and his wife Catherine as King and Queen of England took place at Westminster Abbey, London, on 24 June 1509. Henry acceded to the throne two months prior, following the death of King Henry VII on 21 April, and Catherine became his wife and queen on 11 June. The ceremony was presided over by William Warham, the incumbent Archbishop of Canterbury, and organized by Lady Margaret Beaufort, the King's grandmother who died 5 days later.

A splendid affair, the coronation of the new king and queen was met with great festivities across the country, and the populace had high hopes for the King's reign. Another full-length joint coronation would not be performed in the British Isles until that of James II of England and Mary of Modena in 1685, nearly two centuries later.

== Background ==
The Wars of the Roses were the conflicts between the Houses of Lancaster and York, two cadet branches of the Plantagenet dynasty, over the English throne. Civil disorder under the reign of Richard II saw the crown's seizure by his cousin, Henry of Lancaster, who was also a male-line Plantagenet. His son, Henry V, was popular for his successful military campaigns in France, but died unexpectedly, leaving the throne to his infant son, Henry VI. The king's militaristic failures in France combined with his later mental instability led to his cousin, Edward of York, seizing the throne. Like Henry VI, Edward IV was patrilineally descended from Edward III, but his claim to the throne was based on a line that allowed female succession. His son, the boy-king Edward V, was imprisoned alongside his younger brother on the orders of their uncle, Edward's brother Richard, who promptly seized the throne and declared his nieces and nephews illegitimate by an Act of Parliament.

With the male line of the House of Lancaster extinct, the Lancastrian claim was inherited by Henry Tudor, whose claim was rather tentative. His descent from the Plantagenets was through a woman, and the line through which he descended from was illegitimate. Though the Beauforts were later legitimized, they were barred from the succession by Henry IV. Since the Princes in the Tower disappeared under mysterious circumstances, the rightful Yorkist heir was their sister, Princess Elizabeth.

Henry Tudor invaded England with an army, killed King Richard III, and became King of England as Henry VII. He married Princess Elizabeth to strengthen his claim to the throne, for Henry was only truly king by right of conquest. The union eventually grew into a loving relationship, producing several children. Their eldest son and heir, Arthur, married the Spanish infanta Catherine of Aragon in 1501 as part of an Anglo-Spanish alliance. However, the Prince died the following year, and a marriage was arranged with the widowed Princess of Wales and Arthur's younger brother, Prince Henry. Despite concerns over Catherine's dowry and the issue of affinity, a papal dispensation was sought, and when Henry ascended the throne in 1509, he married Catherine, making her his queen. The ceremony took place on 11 June at the church of the Observant Friars at Greenwich Palace.

== Preparations ==
The King proclaimed that anyone who sought to participate in the coronation should assemble in the White Hall of Westminster Palace by 20 June, and a Court of Claims headed by the Earl of Surrey, the Lord Treasurer and the Earl of Oxford would investigate the applications. Two days later, the King ordered twenty-six 'honorable persons' to serve him dinner at the Tower in anticipation of their creations as Knights of the Bath on 23 June. Said persons included William Blount; Thomas Knyvett, a jousting companion; Sir Henry Clifford, an old friend; and Sir Thomas Boleyn, father of Anne Boleyn, who would later become Henry's second wife.

As it was traditional for the king to hold a solemn vigil before his coronation, Henry observed this custom in the Tower of London on 22 June. He and the Queen travelled there via royal barge from Greenwich, and Henry ordered the royal apartments to be refurbished for his stay. On this occasion, he wore a doublet made of cloth of gold and damask satin underneath a gown made of purple velvet, furred with ermine. The very same afternoon, the King created twenty-four Knights of the Bath.

Costume was given to courtier attendants according to their status and aristocratic rank. Among the ladies in waiting, Lady Anne Percy, a daughter of Henry Percy, 4th Earl of Northumberland, was ranked as a baroness, and given crimson velvet for a gown to be edged with "tawny cloth of gold". Mabel Clifford, the daughter of a baron, Henry Clifford, 10th Baron Clifford, was given less opulent tawny velvet to edge her gown.

== Coronation procession ==
=== The King ===
Around four in the afternoon, on 23 June, the King and Queen participated in their royal entry, a triumphant procession from the Tower to Westminster, to the acclaim of the people. The London thoroughfares were luxuriously furnished in anticipation of the coronation; houses and shops were decorated with tapestries, some even with cloth of gold. The crowds were so large that railing had to be put up on the streets to prevent the people from interfering with the procession.

Ahead of the parade were the newly created Knights of the Bath, wearing blue gowns. Edward Stafford, Duke of Buckingham, who had temporarily been made Constable of England, carried a small silver baton and rode ahead of King Henry. He was dressed in a gown of costly needlework, stones and rubies. Oddly, the Letters Patent that granted the office of Constable of England to Buckingham specified that he was to retain this office only on 23 June. The King, who was all too aware of Buckingham's political ambition, had this condition imposed.

Crowds cheered when the King finally made his appearance, riding a horse adorned with gold damask and ermine. Above him was a golden canopy carried by Barons of the Cinque Ports. Henry himself wore "robes of crimson velvet trimmed with ermine over a gold jacket covered with a breathtaking array of sparkling diamonds, rubies, emeralds and pearls. Around his neck was a collar of huge violet-rose 'ballas rubies' from north Afghanistan." The chronicler Edward Hall wrote:

"The features of his body, his goodly personage, his amiable visage, princely countenance, with the noble qualities of his royal estate, to every man known, needs no rehearsal, considering that for lack of cunning, I cannot express the gifts of grace and of nature that God has endowed him with."

Behind Henry were lords, knights and esquires, followed by the Master of the King's Horse, similarly wearing a golden collar, albeit one less ornate than the King's.

=== The Queen ===
Queen Catherine's procession followed Henry's. The litter she sat in was supported by two white palfreys adorned with white cloth of gold. The queen was decked out in embroidered white satin, and Hall reported that she wore hair down and a coronet with many rich stones. Inventories describe a circlet set with precious stones and pearls. Behind the Queen's litter were chariots with her ladies-in-waiting and the wives of the peers of the realm, wearing coloured silks.

== Coronation ==
The night before the coronation, Henry and Catherine slept in the Painted Chamber of the Palace of Westminster beneath a large mural that depicted Edward the Confessor's 1042 coronation, commissioned by Henry III. Arriving earlier that day, they enjoyed a banquet and then went to St Stephen's Chapel for prayer.

The next day, the royal couple left the palace at around eight in the morning and walked in procession from Westminster Hall to the abbey, accompanied by thirty-eight bishops and abbots. Cloth merchants supplied 1,641 yards of scarlet cloth and 2,040 yards of red cloth for the coronation, making the final price of the coronation robes around £1,307; the total bill for silks and cloths was £4,781; £1,749 was spent on Henry and Catherine's robes.

The coronation was held on Midsummer: Sunday, 24 June 1509. Spectators packed the abbey for the event. Among some of the individuals were Mrs Anne Luke, the King's nurse, and his former French teacher, Giles Duwes. The King's paternal grandmother, Lady Margaret Beaufort, watched proudly in the choir as the presiding cleric, Archbishop William Warham, presented King Henry to his subjects. A mass of voices shouted the traditional Latin cry of Vivat, Vivat Rex, which means 'Long Live the King!'. Henry swore his coronation oath before the Bishop of London:

"With good will and devout soul, I promise ... I shall keep the privilege of the law canon and of holy church ... and I shall ... by God's grace defend you and every each of you, bishops and abbots, through my realm and all these churches to you and them committed; all these things ... I Henry, King of England promise and confirm to keep and observe, so help me God and by these holy evangelists by me bodily touched upon this holy altar."

Henry stood up from the Coronation Chair, proceeded to the high altar and was anointed with holy oil nine times (on his palms, chest, back, each shoulder and elbow and his head; each time with the sign of the cross). The King was then handed the gold orb and sceptre and St Edward's Crown was lowered onto his head.

The nobility of England then paid the King homage, starting with the senior peer, the Duke of Buckingham. He knelt in front of Henry, pledging his loyalty and fealty:

"I Edward Stafford become your liegeman of life and limb and of earthly worship and faith and truth and I shall bear unto you, to live and die against all manner of folk, so God help me and his saints."

Four earls and twenty-one barons then followed suit.

Next was the Queen. After years of mistreatment and floating in limbo, Catherine was finally being crowned Queen of England. She wore "a kirtle furred with miniver ... and a mantle with a train of white cloth of gold with gold and white tassels." The archbishop carefully placed a golden crown upon the Queen's head and placed in her hand a golden sceptre with the image of a dove on the top.

The joint coronation was based on the precedent of Henry VII's coronation ceremony, which posed some issues. Edward Grey was assigned to lead the Queen's litter's horses, a job traditionally assigned to his ancestors. However, the boy was only six. Additionally, the viscounts assigned to carry the sceptre and ivory rod in Catherine's procession were nonexistent: no viscounts were alive in England in 1509.

Outside the Abbey, the ecstatic crowd of people began to tear off bits of the scarlet runner the King had walked on as a souvenir. When Henry and Catherine finally left the Abbey, they did not notice the absence of the runner and proceeded to Westminster Hall to the cheers of the people. There, the royal couple enjoyed their coronation banquet, and festivities continued for days as England celebrated the coronation of the King and Queen. Catherine wrote to her father, "our time is spent in continuous festival".

== Bibliography ==
- Oman, Carola (1962). Mary of Modena. Hodder and Stoughton.
- Ashworth, Leon (2005). King Henry VIII. Cherrytree Books. ISBN 9781842342831.
- Crofton, Ian (2006). The Kings and Queens of England. Quercus Books. ISBN 978-1-84724-141-2.
- Scarisbrick, J. J. (1997). Henry VIII (2 ed.). Yale University Press. ISBN 0-300-07158-2.
- Loades, David (2009). Henry VIII: Court, Church and Conflict. The National Archives. ISBN 978-1-905615-42-1.
- Chrimes, Stanley (1999) [1972]. Henry VII. Yale English Monarchs. New Haven, Connecticut; and London: Yale University Press. ISBN 0-300-07883-8.
- Kendall, Paul Murray (1973). Richard the Third. Sphere Books. ISBN 978-0-351-17095-9.
- Weir, Alison (2011). Britain's Royal Families: The Complete Genealogy. Random House. ISBN 9781446449110.
- Hutchinson, Robert (2012). Young Henry: The Rise of Henry VIII. St. Martin's Publishing Group. ISBN 9781250012746.
- Weir, Alison (2007). The Six Wives of Henry VIII. Grove Atlantic. ISBN 9780802198754.
- Borman, Tracy (2019). Henry VIII and the Men Who Made Him. Grove Atlantic. ISBN 9780802146403.
