= Liber Scintillarum =

Collection of religious texts

Liber Scintillarum (literally "Book of Sparks") is a late seventh or early eighth-century florilegium of biblical and patristic sayings in Latin. It was compiled by Defensor, a monk who in the preface identifies himself as a member of St Martin's Abbey at Ligugé, near Poitiers, and who wrote the work at the behest of his teacher Ursinus, the abbot of St Martin's. Virtually nothing is known of the monk beyond what the preface offers us. The compilation was written sometime between 636, when the important source Isidore of Seville died, and about 750, when the earliest extant manuscript appears to have been produced. It remained incredibly popular through the Middle Ages. It has been repeatedly reused and subsumed into numerous collections of florilegia and is known to survive in around 368 medieval manuscripts.

The "sparks" (scintillae) of the title refer to sayings (such as maxims and proverbs) of the Lord and his saints, which have been excerpted from the Bible and the Church Fathers, and rearranged into as many as 81 chapters. The headings of these chapters refer mainly to vices (e.g. avarice, fornication), virtues (patience, wisdom), devotional practices (confession, prayer) and common themes of human life (marriage, feasting).

In the early part of the eleventh century, a copy of the Latin text was accompanied by an interlinear Old English gloss, for which a little space between the lines was available. It is found in British Library, Royal MS 7 C IV, together with De vitiis et peccatis, again with an interlinear Old English gloss. It belonged to Rochester Cathedral Priory and probably joined the Old Royal Library as part of the spoils of the Dissolution of the Monasteries, like the Rochester Bestiary.

== Editions ==
- J.P. Migne, Patrologia Latina 88.
- Rochais, H.M. (ed.). Liber Scintillarum. Corpus Christianorum, series Latina 117. Turnholt, 1957.
- Rhodes, E.W. (ed.). Defensor's Liber Scintillarum with an interlinear Anglo-Saxon version made early in the eleventh century. EETS. London, 1889.

== Studies ==
- Bremmer, Rolf H. Jr, 'The Reception of Defensor's Liber Scintillarum in Anglo-Saxon England', in ...un tuo serto di fiori in man recando. Scritti in onori di Maria Amalia D'Aronco, vol. 2, ed. Patrizia Lendinara. Udine: Forum, 2008, pp. 75–89.
