= John Theyer =

English royalist lawyer, writer, antiquary and bibliophile

John Theyer (c.1598–1673) was an English royalist lawyer, writer, antiquary and bibliophile.

== Life ==
He was the son of John Theyer (d. 1631), and grandson of Thomas Theyer of Brockworth, Gloucestershire, and was baptized there on 5 November 1598. He entered Magdalen College, Oxford, in 1613, when about sixteen, but did not graduate. After three years at Magdalen he practised common law at New Inn. Anthony Wood's mother proposed to send her son to qualify under Theyer as an attorney. Wood did not go, but he became a lifelong friend, and visited Theyer to make use of his library. It was at Cooper's Hill, Brockworth, a small estate given Theyer by his father on his marriage in 1628. Theyer resided mainly at Brockworth.

At the start of the First English War in 1642, he intervened at Painswick church, where some iconoclastic Parliamentarians had been active; his wife claimed descent from the courtier William Kingston who had an elaborate tomb in the church. Theyer made a court appearance in September with two local men, was fined, and added some church brasses to his collection in 1644; the tomb inscription to Kingston was later reported lost. In 1643 Theyer was in Oxford, serving in the king's army. Wood says he became a Roman Catholic about this time. His estate was sequestrated by the parliament, who pronounced him one of the most 'inveterate' with whom they had to deal. His family were almost destitute until his discharge was obtained on 4 November 1652.

Theyer died at Cooper's Hill on 25 August 1673, and was buried in Brockworth churchyard on 28 August.

== Works ==
Theyer presented to Charles I, in Merton College garden, a copy of his Aerio Mastix, or a Vindication of the Apostolicall and generally received Government of the Church of Christ by Bishops, Oxford, 1643. It was a controversial work, a contribution to the debate on episcopacy arising from Smectymnuus; the title references Aerius of Sebaste, who in the view of some of Theyer's contemporaries was the first Presbyterian. On 6 July 1643 he was created M.A. on merit, by the king's command. He began, but did not live to finish, A Friendly Debate between Protestants and Papists.

== Family ==
By his wife Susan, Theyer had a son John; the latter's son Charles (b. 1651) matriculated at University College, Oxford, on 7 May 1668, and was probably the lecturer of Totteridge, Hertfordshire, who published A Sermon on her Majesty's Happy Anniversary, London, 1707.

== Library ==
Richard Hart, the last prior of Llanthony Secunda, Gloucestershire, was lord of the manor of Brockworth, and the builder of Brockworth Court; he was also the brother of Theyer's grandmother Ann Hart. Theyer inherited Hart's library of manuscripts, which determined his direction as collector. He collected manuscripts from the West Midlands, in particular; he made acquisitions from Worcester and West of England religious houses, including Buckfast Abbey and Hailes Abbey.

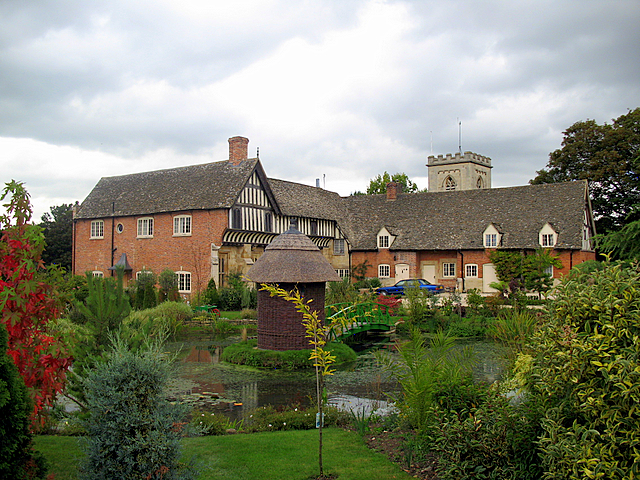
Brockworth Court, Gloucestershire, today.

To his grandson Charles, Theyer bequeathed 800 manuscripts. Charles Theyer then offered them to Oxford University, and the Bodleian Library sent Edward Bernard to see them, but no purchase was made, and they passed into the hands of Robert Scott, a bookseller of London. A catalogue of 336 volumes, dated 29 July 1678, was prepared by William Beveridge and William Jane. About 312 of the manuscripts were bought by Charles II, after Beveridge and Jane had beaten Scott down to half the asking price on some key items. This 1678 accession to the Library was handled by Henry Thynne; it is considered the major addition to the collection of this period, excepting only the Codex Alexandrinus. The 1697 Catalogus Manuscriptorum Angliæ by Bernard does not mention the location as the Royal Library, an anomaly for which Richard Bentley was responsible as librarian. It gives 312 items.

The collection passed with the Old Royal Library to the British Museum (see Royal manuscripts, British Library).

Montague Rhodes James researched the bequest to Charles Theyer. It led him to trace the passage of manuscripts at Llanthony to the library at Lambeth Palace.

=== Particular items ===
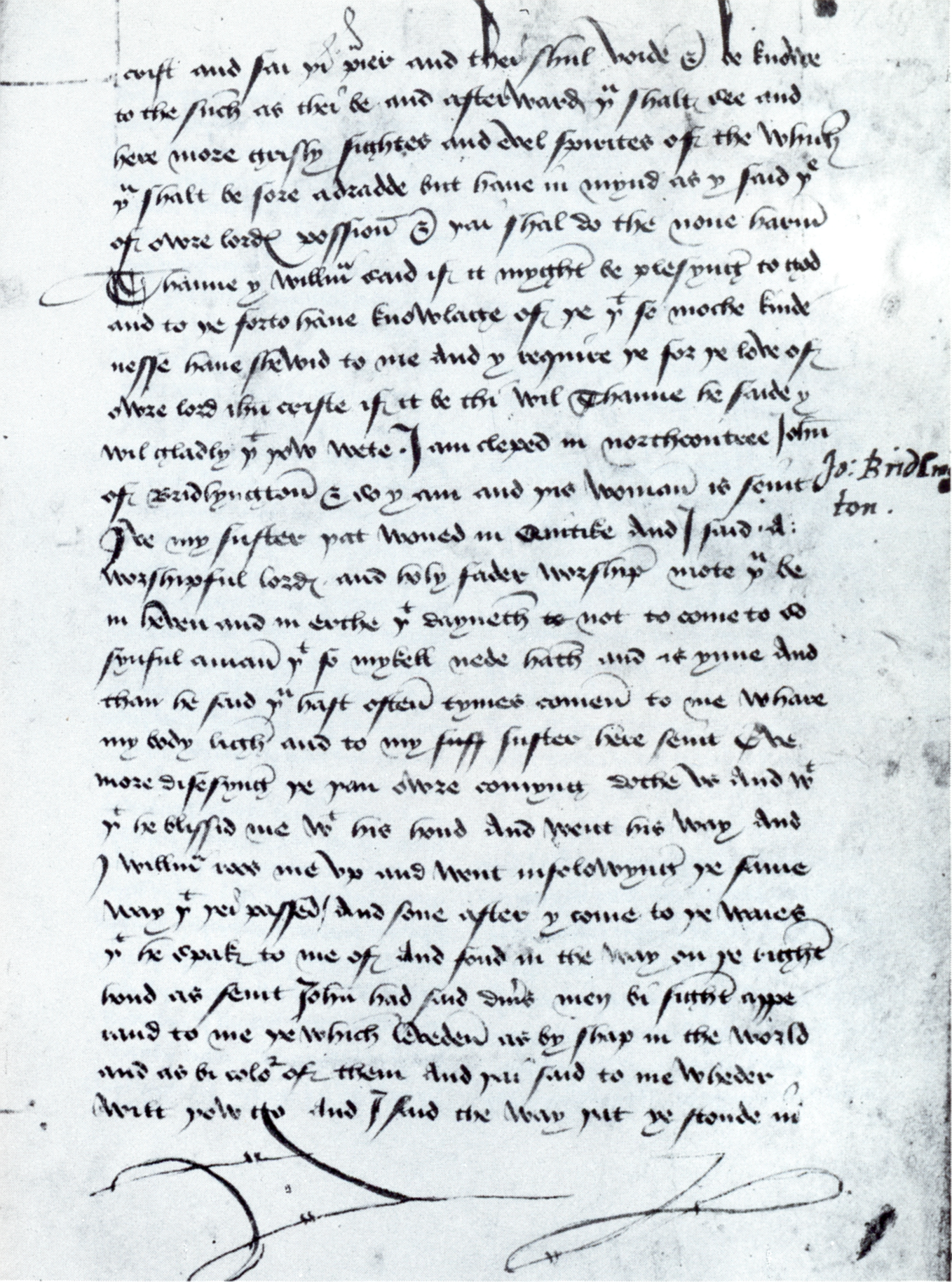
Page from a 15th-century manuscript owned by John Theyer. It is from The Vision of William of Stranton (also William Staunton), a religious work relating to St Patrick's Purgatory.

Theyer's library included works of Roger Bacon, and manuscripts of Thomas Cranmer once thought lost. Humphrey Wanley claimed that Cranmer's Commonplace Book was acquired by Henry Compton, and only later was added to the larger collection of the Old Royal Library. Other items were literature, the Canterbury Tales and William Forrest. Theyer had a manuscript of Dives and Pauper, a work from around 1400, and attributed it to the Carmelite Henry Parker, as did John Bale, but modern scholarship disagrees. A Harley manuscript (MS Harley 460) has a list of the books at Llanthony Priory in about 1350, and an Anglo-Saxon prayerbook of about 820, in Latin with glosses in a Mercian dialect of Old English, which may have been written for a female physician. Perhaps the best known manuscript is the Westminster Psalter (Royal 2. A. xxii), a psalter from Westminster Abbey with important illuminations, begun about 1200, to which five tinted drawings were added some fifty years later. According to the British Library it contains "some of the most elegant and refined painting of the period".
