= William Forrest (poet) =

English Catholic priest and poet

William Forrest (fl. 1581) was an English Catholic priest and poet.

== Life ==
Forrest is stated by Anthony Wood to have been a relative of John Forest, the Franciscan friar. He received his education at Christ Church, Oxford, and he was present at the discussions held at Oxford in 1530, when Henry VIII sought to procure the judgment of the university in the matter of his divorce; he appears to have attended the funeral of Queen Catherine of Aragon at Peterborough in 1536. He was an eyewitness of the erection of Wolsey's Cardinal College on the site of St Frideswide's Priory, and he was appointed to a post in the college as refounded by the king.

In 1553 he came forward with congratulations on the accession of Queen Mary, and was soon afterwards nominated one of the queen's chaplains. Of his career after the death of Mary nothing certain is known. He was probably protected by Thomas Howard, 2nd Duke of Norfolk, to whom he dedicated his "History of Joseph" shortly before the duke's execution in 1572.

Forrest remained a Catholic. This is shown by the fact that the two dates "27 Oct. 1572, per me Guil. Forrestum," and "1581" occur in a volume (British Library Harley MS 1703) containing a poem which in a devout tone treats of the life of the Blessed Virgin and of the Immaculate Conception. But he was not papalist, and in one of his poems he speaks strongly of the right of each national branch of the church to enjoy self-government.

He was well skilled in music, and owned a collection of the compositions then in vogue. These manuscripts came into the hands of William Heather, founder of the musical praxis and professorship at Oxford, and are preserved in the archives there. Forrest was on terms of friendship with Alexander Barclay. There is a portrait of him in British Library Royal MS.17 D.iii. He is represented as a young man in a priest's gown, and with long flowing hair not tonsured.

== Works ==
In 1548 he dedicated his version of the treatise De regimine Principum to the Duke of Somerset, and also in 1551 his paraphrase of some of the Psalms. In 1558 Forrest presented to Queen Mary his poem of "The Second Gresyld."

His poetical works are:

- "The History of Joseph the Chaiste composed in balladde royall crudely; largely derived from the Testaments of the Twelve Patriarchs. In two parts." Dedicated to Thomas Howard, duke of Norfolk, and dated as having been finished 11 April 1569, but said by the author to have been originally written twenty-four years before. The first part, written on vellum, is in the library of University College, Oxford, and the second part is in the Royal manuscripts, British Library, 18 C. xiii. A copy of both parts in one folio volume of 286 pages, written on paper, was collected by Sir Thomas Phillipps.
- "A Notable Warke called the pleasant Poesie of princelie Practise, composed of late by the simple and unlearned Sir William Forrest, priest, much part collected out of a booke entitled the "Governance of Noblemen", which booke the wyse philosopher Aristotle wrote to his disciple Alexander the Great." This work, written in 1548, and dedicated to the Duke of Somerset, was intended for the use of Edward VI. A long extract from it is printed in "England in the Reign of Henry VIII. Starkey's Life and Letters" (Early English Text Society), 1878, pt. i. p. lxxix seq. The treatise referred to in the title, "De regimine Principum," was written by Ægidius Romanus.
- A metrical version of some of the Psalms, written in 1551, and also dedicated to the Duke of Somerset.
- "A New Ballade of the Marigolde. Imprinted at London in Aldersgate Street by Richard Lant" [1553]. Verses on the accession of Queen Mary. The ballad was reprinted by Thomas Park in the second edition of the "Harleian Miscellany" (1813).
- Pater Noster and Te Deum, versified as a prayer and a thanksgiving for Queen Mary. In the first edition of John Foxe's Actes and Monuments (1563).
- "A true and most notable History of a right noble and famous Lady, produced in Spain, entitled The Second Gresyld, practised not long out of this time, in much part Tragedious, as delectable both to Hearers and Readers," folio. In the manuscripts of Anthony Wood in the Bodleian Library; it was given to Wood by Ralph Sheldon of Weston Park, Warwickshire. The work, which was finished 25 June 1558, is a narrative in verse of the divorce of Queen Catherine of Aragon. Wood extracted some passages for his English "Annals of the University of Oxford." These are printed in John Gutch's edition of the "Annals" (1796), ii. 47, 115. The ninth chapter was contributed by Philip Bliss in 1814 to Sir Samuel Egerton Brydges's "British Bibliographer," iv. 200. The entire poem was printed by the Roxburghe Club, with the title of "The History of Grisild the Second," London, 1875, edited by William Dunn Macray.
- "An Oration consolatorye to Queen Marye." At the end of the preceding work.
- Life of the Blessed Virgin Mary, being a poem in praise of her and in honour of the Immaculate Conception, followed by miscellaneous, moral, and religious verses, dated from 1572 to 1581.
