= Rochester Bestiary =

Richly illuminated manuscript copy of a mediaeval bestiary

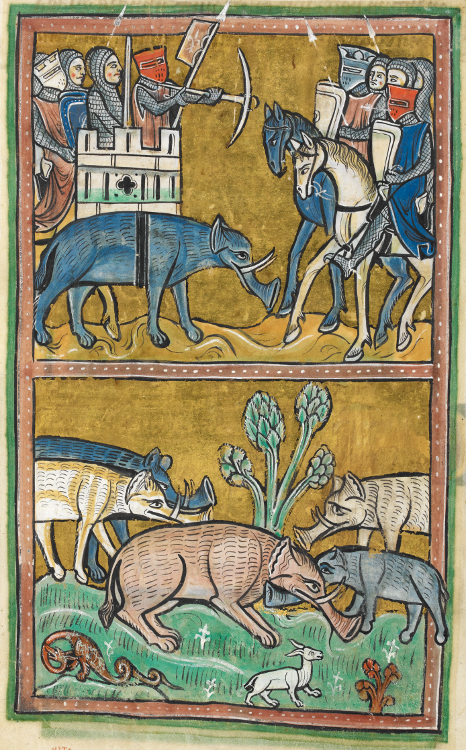
Detail of a miniature of elephants, which were known to have been ridden into battle in India carrying castles (howdahs) on their backs; folio 11v.

The Rochester Bestiary (London, British Library, Royal MS 12 F.xiii) is a richly illuminated manuscript copy of a mediaeval bestiary, a book describing the appearance and habits of a large number of familiar and exotic animals, both real and legendary. The animals' characteristics are frequently allegorised, with the addition of a Christian moral.

== The bestiary tradition ==
The mediaeval bestiary ultimately derives from the Greek-language Physiologus, a text whose precise date and place of origin is disputed, but which was most likely written in North Africa sometime in the second or third century. The Physiologus was translated into Latin several times, at least as far back as the eighth century, the date of the first extant manuscripts, and likely much earlier, perhaps the fourth century. While the earliest Latin translations were extremely faithful to their Greek source, later versions adapted more freely, particularly by the inclusion of additional information from other sources, including Pliny's Historia naturalis, and, most significantly, Isidore of Seville's Etymologies. The most important of the Latin Physiologus translations — the one now known by scholars as the "B Version" — was expanded even further in the twelfth century (most likely in the 1160s or 1170s), with more additions from Isidore, to become the so-called "Second Family" standard form of what now may be properly termed as the bestiary. This text was much longer than the original Physiologus and included in its typical format over 100 sections, distributed among nine major divisions of varying size. The first division included 44 animals or beasts and the second 35 birds, followed by a large division on different varieties of snakes, and divisions on worms, fish, trees, precious stones, and the nature and ages of man. Manuscripts from this most familiar version of the bestiary were produced from the twelfth to sixteenth centuries, with most dating from the thirteenth century.

== Manuscript description ==
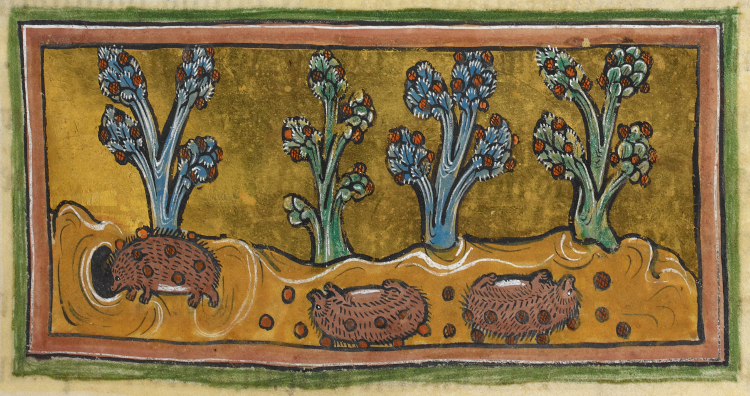
Detail of a miniature of hedgehogs rolling on grapes, sticking them to their spines to carry back to their young; folio 45r.

The Rochester Bestiary is a parchment manuscript dating from c. 1230–1240. Its principle contents are a bestiary, but it also contains a short lapidary (a treatise on stones) in French prose and, as the flyleaves, two leaves of a 14th-century service book. It is illustrated with 55 finished miniatures of various animals, each at the end of the passage describing that animal. On some pages, instructions to the illuminator are visible, briefly describing what the planned picture should depict. About a third of the way through the manuscript (f. 52v and following, after the vulture), the illustrations cease: while spaces remain where they were intended to be placed, no illustrations were ever added. The style of the miniatures shows some evidence that the illustrations were made as much as a decade or more after the initial production of the text, and it is possible that the artist did not fully understand the projected plan envisioned by the scribe: by adding a fourth picture of a lion, instead of the planned three, he forced subsequent illustrations to be placed after the animals they described, instead of before. Three other extant manuscripts feature illuminations by this artist: Cambridge, University Library, MS. Ee.2.23 (a Bible), Peterborough, Cathedral Library, MS. 10 (a Bible), and Stockholm, National Museum, MS. B. 2010 (a psalter). A fourth manuscript (Turin, Biblioteca Nazionale, Cod. L.IV.25) contained two full-page miniatures from this artist, but was destroyed in 1904.

== History of the manuscript ==
The manuscript is usually assumed to have been made at St. Andrew's Priory at Rochester Cathedral. An inscription places the book there with certainty in the fourteenth century. At some point, it appears that the book was stolen from the priory, as another fourteenth-century inscription notes its return by a "brother John Malling", who may have been the culprit: a man named John Malling was excommunicated in 1387 as an apostate and thief. By 1542 it was in the possession of the king, as it is listed in an inventory of the royal library at Westminster in that year. King George II donated it, together with the rest of the Old Royal Library, to the British Museum in 1757, and it is now at the British Library.

== Adaptation of the text in the Rochester manuscript ==
Additions to the standard bestiary text have been made in the Rochester Bestiary by drawing from Part IV of the Pantheologus by Peter of Aldgate. A complete copy of the Pantheologus, now extant as British Library, Royal MS. 7 E.viii, was located in Rochester in the early 13th century, and may have been the direct source for the bestiary additions.

== The animals ==
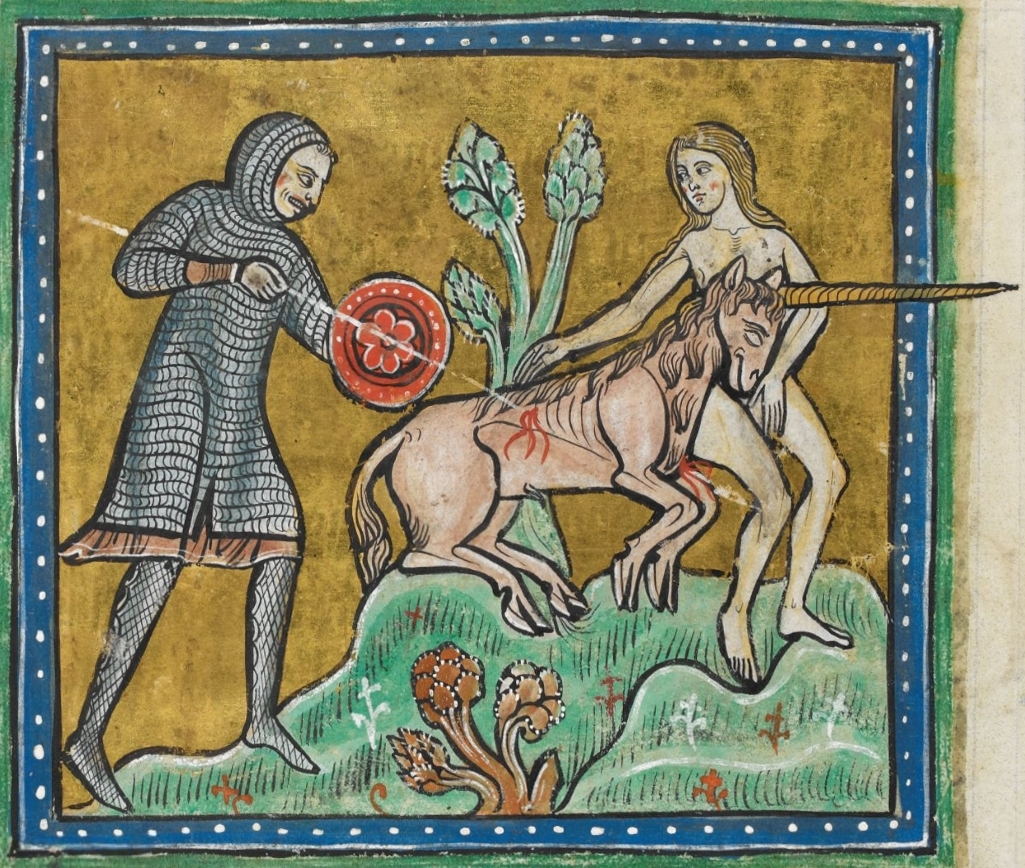
Detail of a miniature of a unicorn, tamed by a virgin and being killed by a hunter; folio 10v.

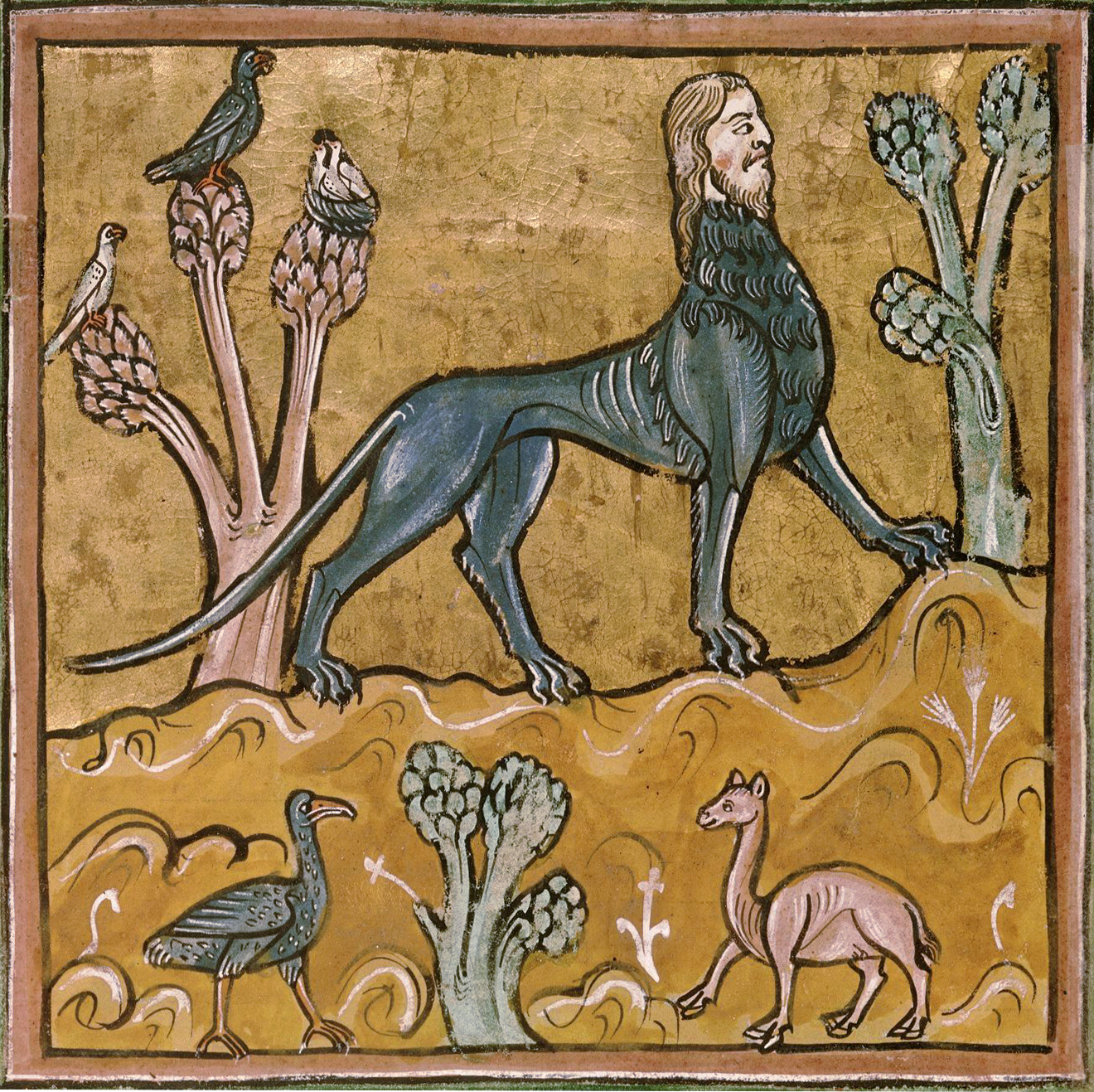
Detail of a miniature of a manticore, with the head of a man and the body of a lion; folio 24v.

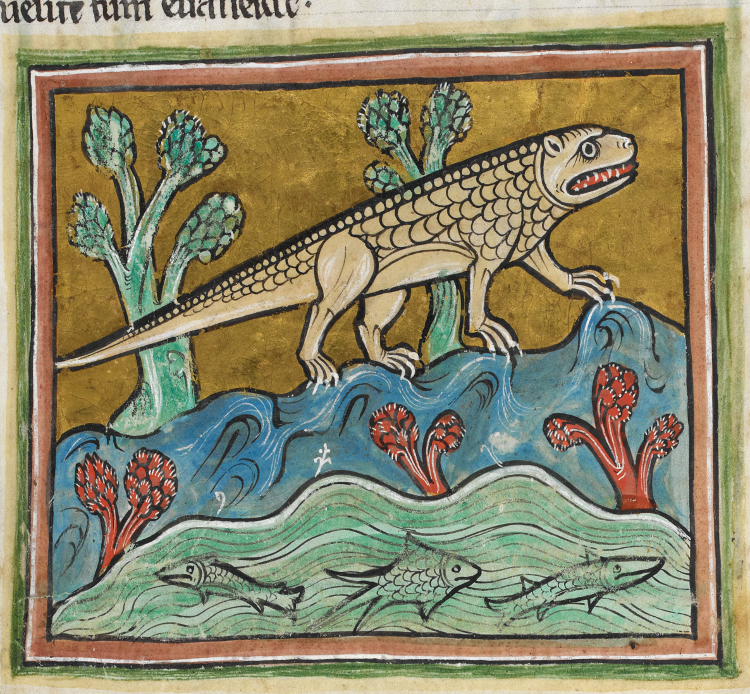
Detail of a miniature of a crocodile, whose name derives from the Greek for 'pebble worm'; folio 24r.

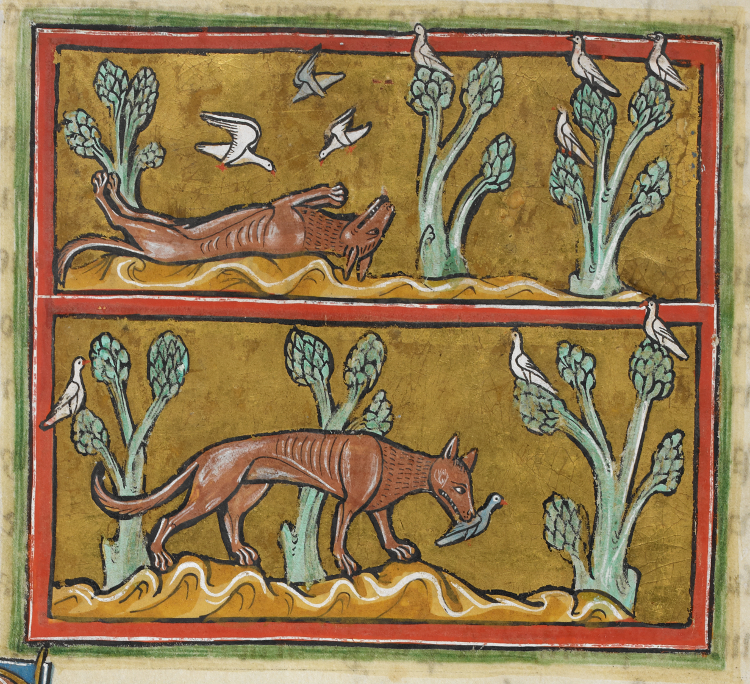
Detail of a miniature of a fox, which lures in its prey by playing dead; folio 26v.

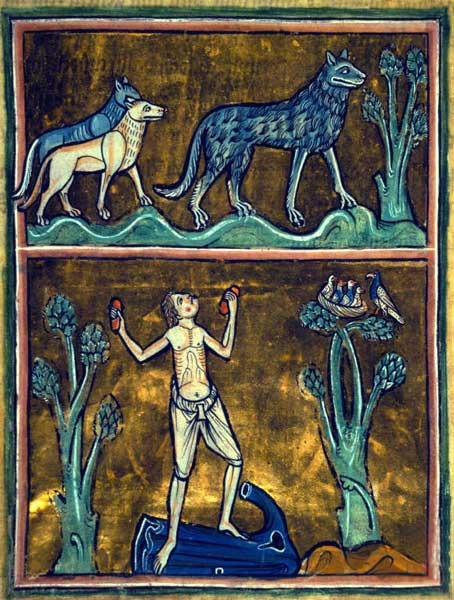
The gaze of a wolf could strike a man dumb, for which the only cure was tearing off the man's clothes and hammering two stones together to frighten the wolf away, allegorized as casting off sin to drive away the devil; detail of a miniature from f. 29r; folio 29r.

The bestiary features the following animals:

1. Lion
2. Tiger
3. Leopard
4. Panther
5. Antelope
6. Unicorn ("which is called 'rhinoceros' by the Greeks")
7. Lynx
8. Griffin
9. Elephant
10. Beaver
11. Ibex
12. Hyena
13. Bonasus (an Asian animal with a bull's head and curling horns)
14. Ape
15. Satyr
16. Stag
17. Goat
18. She-goat
19. Monocerus
20. Bear
21. Leucrota (an Indian animal with the body of a lion and the head of a horse)
22. Crocodile
23. Manticore (an Indian animal with the face of a man and the body of a lion)
24. Parandrus (an Ethiopian animal sometimes identified as a reindeer or elk)
25. Fox
26. Yale (an animal with the tail of an elephant and the jaws of a goat)
27. Wolf
28. Dog
29. Sheep
30. Ram (male sheep) and wether (castrated male sheep)
31. Lamb
32. He-goat and kid
33. Boar
34. Bull
35. Ox and wild ox
36. Camel
37. Dromedary
38. Ass
39. Onager (wild ass)
40. Horse
41. Cat
42. Mouse
43. Weasel
44. Mole
45. Hedgehog
46. Ant
47. Eagle
48. Vulture
49. Crane
50. Parrot
51. Caladrius (a white bird capable of predicting the outcome of an illness)
52. Swan
53. Stork
54. Ibis
55. Coot
56. Ostrich
57. Kingfisher
58. Heron
59. Goose
60. Horned owl
61. Small owl or night raven
62. Phoenix
63. Cinnamolgus (an Arabian bird that nests in the cinnamon tree)
64. Hercinia (a German bird that glows in the dark)
65. Hoopoe
66. Pelican
67. Siren (half-human, half-bird)
68. Partridge
69. Quail
70. Magpie and woodpecker
71. Hawk
72. Gull
73. Tawny owl
74. Bat
75. Raven
76. Crow
77. Dove
78. Turtledove
79. Tern
80. Peacock
81. Cock
82. Hen
83. Duck
84. Bee
85. Peridexion tree (an Indian tree whose shadow frightens dragons)
86. Asp
87. Dragon
88. Basilisk (the "king of serpents", since it can kill other serpents with its odour)
89. Viper
90. Scitalis (a snake that can hypnotize with its shining back)
91. Amphisbaena (a snake with two heads)
92. Hydrus (a sea serpent that, when swallowed by a crocodile, bursts out of its stomach, killing it)
93. Jaculus (a winged serpent)
94. Boa
95. Siren serpent (a winged serpent from Arabia)
96. Seps (a snake whose venom dissolves the bones as well as flesh of its prey)
97. Dipsa (a snake whose venom is so poisonous, it kills before the victim perceives the bite)
98. Salamander
99. Saura lizard (a lizard that renews its eyesight by looking at the sun)
100. Gecko
101. Snake
102. Scorpion
103. Various types of "worm", including the spider, the locust, the flea, etc.
104. Various types of "fish", including the whale, the dolphin, the crocodile, the sea urchin, and other sea animals
105. Various types of trees, including the palm, the laurel, the fig, the mulberry, etc.
106. Long section on the nature of man and the parts of the human body
107. Fire stones (which ignite when brought together)

A French-language lapidary follows directly on the Latin description of fire stones, giving further descriptions of a large number of stones, including the magnet, coral, carnelian, ceraunius (the "thunder-stone"), crystal, and many others.
