= Giles Duwes =

Giles Duwes, D'Ewes, Du Guez, Du Wes, or Dewes (died 1535) was a Fleming, who was a tutor and musician at the English court during the Tudor period.

He was the French tutor of Arthur, Prince of Wales, Prince Henry, the future Henry VIII of England and Henry's daughter, the future Mary I. For the instruction of Mary, he wrote a grammar text titled An Introductorie for to lerne to rede, to pronounce and to speke French trewly, compyled for the right high, excellent and most vertuous lady the Lady Mary of Englande, doughter of our most gracious soverayn Lorde Kyng Henry the Eight.

He also taught Prince Henry the lute as well as being his librarian and 'keeper of the wardrobe'.
