= Denis Farkasfalvy =

American-Hungarian theologian

Denis Farkasfalvy (Hungarian: Farkasfalvy Dénes; June 23, 1936 – May 20, 2020) was a Hungarian-American Catholic priest and monk of the Cistercian Order. He was an abbot, theologian, author and translator.

== Biography ==
=== Flight from Hungary, theological studies, and priestly ordination ===
His baptismal name was Miklós; his father was a mechanical engineer. As a schoolboy he attended the school run by Cistercian priests in his home town of Székesfehérvár, Hungary. After it was closed down by the communist government during the Second Hungarian Republic, in 1948 he transferred to the famous school run by Benedictines in Pannonhalma. He graduated in 1954 and became a clandestine Cistercian novice for Zirc Abbey in 1955; the monastery was officially suppressed at the time by the Hungarian People's Republic. His name in monastic life was Denis (Hungarian: Dénes) after Saint Denis of Paris. After the Hungarian Revolution of 1956 he took the advice of his novice master Lóránt Sigmond (1911–1964) and abbot Vendel Endrédy and fled. His journey led him via Austria (Heiligenkreuz Abbey) to Rome, where he enrolled at the Benedictine university St. Anselm's. He received his doctorate there in 1962. He made his solemn vows (for Zirc) in 1960 in the Abbey of Lilienfeld. This Austrian abbey also hosted his priestly ordination in 1961.

=== Headmaster and abbot in Texas ===
Since most of the Zirc monks had fled Hungary for the US in 1954, Fr. Denis was sent to Irving, Texas in order to teach at the Our Lady of Dallas monastery school. Since the need for math teachers was great, he studied for and received a master's degree in mathematics at Texas Christian University in Fort Worth. As a student, he served as the chaplain to the School Sisters of Namur, who in turn helped him learn English. He was made Headmaster of Cistercian Prep, which was rapidly becoming an elite prep school, in 1969 and ran it for 12 years. He also taught several courses at university level at the University of Dallas.

He was abbot from 1988 to 2012. Under his leadership, the abbey built a new and monumental church in the trademark Cistercian style, attracting international attention and many vocations. The entire abbey was renovated in the course of the project.

He died at age 83, having been in ill health for several years and then contracting COVID-19 during the COVID-19 pandemic in Texas.

=== Theologian and translator ===
Farkasfalvy published widely on theology, writing in English, Hungarian, and French. He also worked as the Hungarian translator of Latin texts and the work of German poet Rainer Maria Rilke. He served as a member of the Pontifical Biblical Commission from 2002 to 2014, the first Hungarian to have held this honor. In 2010 he was awarded the St. Stephen prize (Stephanus-díj) for Theology in Budapest. In Dallas, he was given the Catholic Foundation Award in 2016.

== Publications (a selection) ==
=== Original works ===
- L'inspiration de l'Écriture Sainte dans la théologie de Saint Bernard. Herder, Rom 1964. (Dissertation)
- Bevezetes a szentirastudomanyba. Rom 1976. (An Introduction to Theology)
- A lelki élet teológiája. Rom 1980. Budapest 1995. (Theology of Spirituality)
- (with William R. Farmer) The Formation of the New Testament Canon. An ecumenical approach. Harold W. Attridge, ed. Paulist Press, New York 1983.
- (Editor) Bernard of Clairvaux: Sämtliche Werke lateinisch/deutsch. Other editors: Gerhard Winkler, in cooperation with Alberich Altermatt and Polykarp Zakar. 10 vols. Tyrolia-Verlag, Innsbruck 1990–1999.
- Commemorating the 900th Anniversary of Cistercian Beginnings, 1098–1998. 40 years of Cistercian Life in Texas, 1958–1998. Carrollton, TX 1998.
- Inspiration and Interpretation. A Theological Introduction to Sacred Scripture. Catholic University of America Press, Washington, D.C. 2010.
- The Marian Mystery. The Outline of a Mariology. St Pauls, Staten Island, NY 2014.
- A Theology of the Christian Bible. Revelation, Inspiration, Canon. Catholic University of America Press, Washington, D.C. 2018.
- In search of a lasting home. The story of the Cistercians in Texas. Abbey and school. Cistercian Abbey Our Lady of Dallas, Irving, Texas 2019.
- A Biblical Path to the Triune God: Jesus, Paul, and the Revelation of the Trinity. Edited by Thomas Esposito. Catholic University of America Press, Washington, D.C. 2021.

=== Translations into Hungarian ===
==== Bible ====
- Zsoltároskönyv. Prugg, Eisenstadt 1975. Budapest 2006 (Psalms)
- A Római Levél. Bevezetés, fordítás és magyarázat. Prugg, Eisenstadt 1983. (Epistle to the Romans)
- Himnuszok. Válogatás a Római Breviárium himnuszaiból. Budapest 1984, 2010. (Hymns from the Roman Breviary)
- Testté vált szó. Evangélium Szent János szerint. Fordítás, jegyzetek és magyarázat. Prugg, Eisenstadt 1989. (Gospel of John)

==== Translations of Rainer Maria Rilke ====
- Rilke nyomában. Budapest 1990. (Selected poems)
- Rainer Maria Rilke: Szonettek Orfeuszhoz. Budapest 2014. (Sonnets to Orpheus)
- Rainer Maria Rilke: Mária élete. Budapest 2015. (Life of the Virgin Mary)

== Secondary Sources ==
- "Das Geschenk des Neubeginns: Denis Farkasfalvy OCist im Gespräch". In: Erbe und Auftrag 95, 2019, pp. 190–203.
