= Louis Lekai =

- Born: Lékai Gyula; February 4, 1916; Budapest, Hungary
- Died: July 1, 1994 (aged 78); Irving, Texas, U.S.
- Occupations: Cistercian monk, history professor

Louis Julius Lekai, O.Cist. (4 February 1916 – 1 July 1994) was an American monk, historian and university professor born in Hungary.

== Early life and education ==
Julius (Gyula) Lékai was born in Budapest. He was a student at the Cistercian school (Budai-Ciszterci-Szent Imre-Gymnasium) in Budapest and entered the novitiate at Zirc Abbey in 1934. He was ordained a priest in 1941 and completed his doctorate a year later at Budapest University. His dissertation was an analysis of Hungarian historical research in the period 1790–1830.

== Career ==
Lékai taught at the Cistercian school (Gárdonyi Géza Ciszterci Gimnázium) in Eger until 1947. He also taught history at the Faculty of Laws at the Károly-Eszterházy University in Eger (1943–1944). During the Second World War he was a military chaplain for the Hungarian Army. He fled to the United States in October 1947 and he became an American citizen in 1953.

Lekai's first home in the United States was Our Lady of Spring Bank Abbey in Wisconsin; from 1953 to 1955 he lived in Buffalo, teaching at Canisius College, and as of 1955 he was in the Cistercian Abbey of Our Lady of Dallas. He was made prior there in 1969 and served as such until 1976. He was assistant professor of history at Canisius from 1952 to 1956. 1956 he was made associate professor at the University of Dallas, advancing to full Professor in 1958 and teaching there until his retirement in 1986.

Lekai's research addressed aspects of Cistercian history which were rarely covered before his time, such as Baroque abbeys in France immediately before the French Revolution and Cistercian involvement at great European universities, most notably in Paris. He was able to reshape common perceptions of urban monks and feudal abbeys by applying concentrated analysis of archival sources. His personal fate as a refugee had forced him to learn many languages, so that he had an overview of monastic research in all the major European languages. His general history of the Cistercian Order (subtitled in a manner typical for Lekai Ideals and Reality) was the standard work for decades, going into several reprints and translations.

A stroke he suffered in 1981 made Lekai unable to speak or write until his death 13 years later in Irving, Texas.

== Publications ==
- The White Monks. A History of the Cistercian Order, Okauchee, Wisconsin, Our Lady of Spring Bank, 1953
  - Les moines blancs. Histoire de l’ordre cistercien, Paris, Editions du Seuil, 1957 (translated by the nuns of Boulaur Abbey)
  - Geschichte und Wirken der Weißen Mönche. Der Orden der Cistercienser, ed. Ambrosius Schneider (1911–2002), Köln, Wienand, 1958
- "Moral and Material Status of French Cistercian Abbeys in the Seventeenth Century", in: Analecta Cisterciensia 19, 1963, p. 199–266
- "Cistercian Monasteries and the French Episcopate on the Eve of the Revolution", in: Analecta Cisterciensia 23, 1967, p. 66–114, 179–225
- The Rise of the Cistercian Strict Observance in Seventeenth Century France, Washington, D.C., The Catholic University of America Press, 1968
- The Cistercians. Ideals and Reality, [Kent, Ohio], Kent State University Press, 1977
  - De orde van Cîteaux. Cisterciënsers en Trappisten. Idealen en werkelijkheid, Achel, Abdij, 1980
  - Los Cistercienses. Ideales y realidad, Barcelona, Herder, 1987
  - I cistercensi. Ideali e realtá, Florenz, Certosa, Monaci cisterciensi, 1989
  - Shitō kai shūdōin, Tokio, 1989 (japanisch)

=== On Nicolas Cotheret ===
- "Nicolas Cotheret and His History of the Abbots of Cîteaux", in: Cistercians in the Late Middle Ages. Studies in Medieval Cistercian History 6, hrsg. von E. Rozanne Elder, Kalamazoo, Michigan, Cistercian Publications, 1981, p. 70–89 (Cistercian Studies 64)
- Nicolas Cotheret's Annals of Citeaux. Outlined from the French original, Kalamazoo, Michigan, Cistercian Publications, 1982 (Cistercian Studies 57)
  - Les Annales de Cîteaux de Nicolas Cotheret, in: Analecta Cisterciensia 40, 1984, p. 150–303; 41, 1985, p. 42–315; 42, 1986, p. 265–330

=== On Cistercian Houses of Study in France (in: Analecta Cisterciensia vols. 25–28, 1969–1972) ===
- “Introduction à l´étude des collèges cisterciens en France avant la Révolution“, 25, 1969, p. 145–179
- “The Parisian College of Saint Bernard in 1634 and 1635”, 25, 1969, p. 180–208
- “The Financial Status of the Parisian College of Saint Bernard”, 1765 1790, 25, 1969, p. 209–244
- “The College of Saint Bernard in Paris on the Eve of the Revolution”, 26, 1970, p. 253–279
- “The College of Saint Bernard in Toulouse in the Middle Ages”, 27, 1971, p. 143–155
- “The College of Saint Bernard in Toulouse, 1533– 1791”, 27, 1971, p. 157–211
- “The College of Saint Bernard in Paris in the Sixteenth and Seventeenth Centuries”, 28, 1972, p. 167–218
- (see also “The Cistercian college of Dole in the 17th and 18th centuries”, in: Revue bénédictine 83, 1973, p. 436–447)

== About Lekai ==
- Studiosorum speculum. Studies in honor of Louis J. Lekai, hrsg. von John R. Sommerfeldt und Francis R. Swietek, Kalamazoo, Mich., Cistercian Publications, 1993 (Cistercian Studies Series 141)
- Review of The Cistercians. Ideals and Reality, in: Studies: an Irish quarterly review of letters, philosophy & science 67 (1976), p. 250
