= Cistercian Preparatory School =

Location
- 3660 Cistercian Road; Irving, Texas 75039; United States; 32°51′19″N 96°55′17″W

Information
- Type: Private
- Motto: Ardere et Lucere (To Enkindle and Enlighten)
- Religious affiliations: Roman Catholic; Cistercians
- Established: 1962; 64 years ago
- CEEB code: 443-558
- Headmaster: Fr. Paul M. McCormick, O.Cist.
- Teaching staff: 53 (2020-21)
- Grades: 5–12
- Gender: Boys
- Enrollment: 355 (2020-21)
- Student to teacher ratio: 7∶1 (2020-21)
- Campus size: 82 acres (33 ha)
- Colors: Black; White
- Athletics conference: Southwest Preparatory Conference
- Mascot: Hawks
- Accreditation: Independent Schools Association of the Southwest
- Publication: Reflections (literary/art magazine)
- Newspaper: Informer
- Yearbook: Exodus
- Website: school.cistercian.org

Cistercian Preparatory School is a private school for boys located in Irving, Texas. The school follows the Cistercian tradition.

== History ==
Cistercian was founded by a group of monks from Hungary's Zirc Abbey, who had fled Hungary from ongoing Soviet pressure following WWII. In 1948, Cistercian secondary schools in Hungary had been closed and in 1950, their monasteries had been confiscated. Zirc monks began immigrating, with many of them ending up in Dallas, where they created a new abbey and found leadership and teaching roles at the University of Dallas. Cistercian monks had been involved in secondary education in Europe since the 18th century, and by 1962, they founded the Cistercian School in Dallas.

== Current program ==
The graduating class of 2021 had 46 students, and there were 355 total students in grades 5-12. While community service is not required, the typical class averages 8000 hours of volunteer contributions. All graduates attend 4-year colleges. In 2021, 19% of the students received financial assistance. Of the 53 faculty members, 30% are Cistercian monks and 85% have graduate degrees.

Cistercian's academic program has been highly rated, both regionally and nationally, for many years. For example, Cistercian was ranked among the 50 “Smartest Private High Schools in the United States” by one independent group and, in 2021, was named the 3rd best Catholic high school in the country.

== Athletics ==
Students are encouraged to participate in sports in every season. Cistercian fields teams in nine varsity sports in three athletic seasons: football and cross country (fall); basketball, soccer, and swimming (winter); baseball, track & field, tennis (spring). The school is a member of the Southwest Preparatory Conference, which hosts championship tournaments and meets at the end of every season. The school's mascot is the hawk. Its colors are black and white.

== Notable alumni ==
- Will Ford Hartnett (1974) - former member of the Texas House of Representatives (1993–2013)
- Geoff Marslett (1992) - independent filmmaker and professor
- Ryan Sitton (1993) - member of the Texas Railroad Commission (2015–2021)
- Andrés Ruzo (2005) - geoscientist, conservationist, author, science communicator and educator, who studied the Boiling River of the Amazon
- Will Arbery (2007) - playwright, author of Heroes of the Fourth Turning; 2020 Pulitzer Prize finalist, winner of 2020 Whiting Award in drama
- Alec Radford (2011) - artificial intelligence researcher, lead author of OpenAI's seminal research paper on GPT

== Notable faculty ==
- Fr. Bede Lackner, theologian and historian
- Fr. Denis Farkasfalvy, Abbot of Our Lady of Dallas Abbey from 1988 to 2012, theologian, and historian; Headmaster of Cistercian from 1969 to 1981 and longtime math teacher at the school
- Fr. Roch Kereszty, theologian
