= Maurus Esteva Alsina =

Maurus Esteva Alsina or Maur Esteva i Alsina, OCist (10 July 1933 – 14 November 2014) was the Abbot General of the Cistercian Order between 1995 and 2010.

== Career ==
He was born in Catalonia, Spain, and entered the community of the Royal Abbey of Santa Maria de Poblet in 1958. He studied in Rome. He was elected abbot in 1970, during a period in which his abbey flourished. In 1995 he succeeded Ferenc Polikárp Zakar as Abbot General of the Common observance. He was succeeded in 2010 by Mauro-Giuseppe Lepori. He died in Poblet Abbey.

== Author ==
- Poblet, escola de servei: sermons capitulars.
