= Lékai =

Lékai is a Hungarian surname. Notable people with this surname include:

- László Lékai (1910–1986), Archbishop of Esztergom and a Cardinal
- Louis Lekai, O.Cist. (1916–1994), American monk, historian and university professor born in Hungary
- Máté Lékai (born 1988), Hungarian handball player
