= Abthain =

English and Lowland Scots form of Latin word

Abthain (or abthane) is an English or Lowland Scots form of the middle-Latin word abthania (Gaelic abdhaine), meaning abbacy. The exact sense of the word being lost, it was presumed to denote some ancient dignity, the holder of which was called abthanus or abthane.

William Forbes Skene holds that the correct meaning of abthain (or abthane) is not "abbot" or "over-thane", but "abbey" or "monastery". The word has special reference to the territories of the churches and monasteries founded by the old Celtic or Columban monks, mostly between the mountain chain of the Mounth and the Firth of Forth. Skene recommended the use of the words abthany or abthanry.

Many of these abthains passed into the hands of laymen, and were transmitted from father to son. They paid certain ecclesiastical tributes, and seem to have closely resembled the termonn lands of the early Irish Church.

== See also ==
- Crínán of Dunkeld
- Lay abbot
