= Zirc Bestiary =

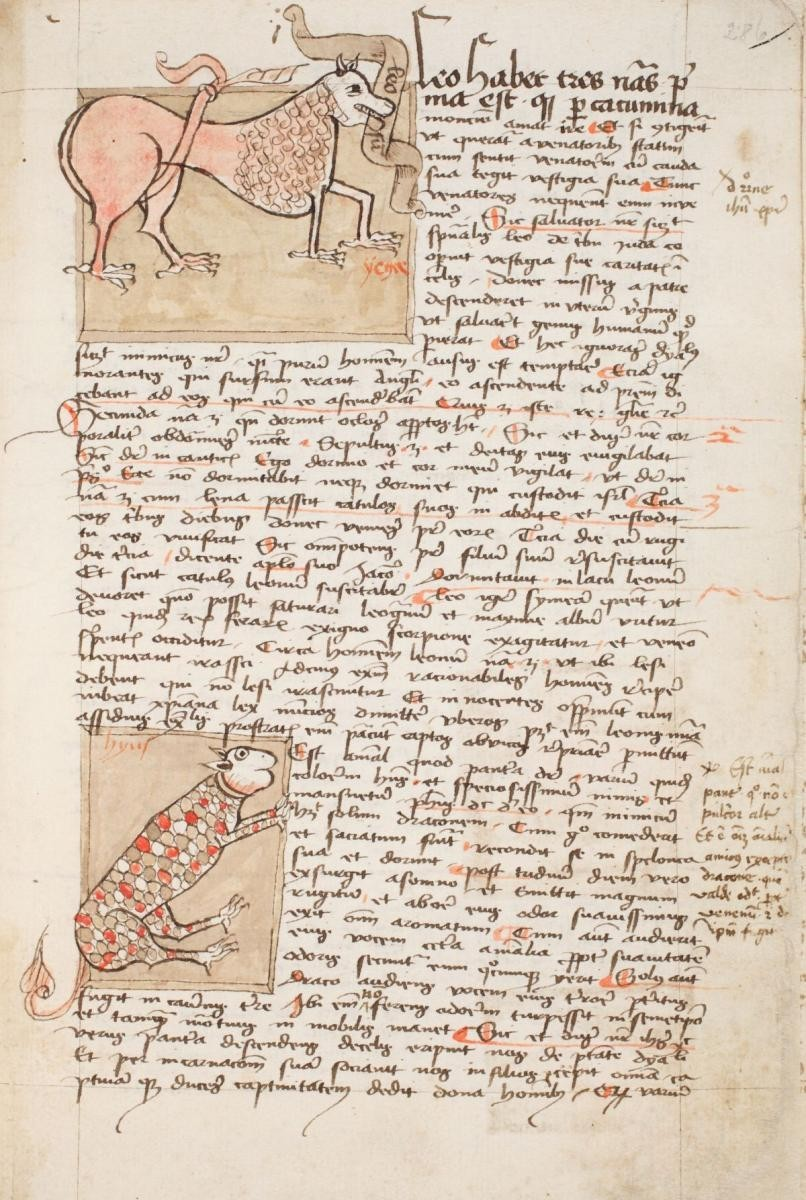
First page (fol. 286r) depicts lion and panther

The Zirc Bestiary (Latin: Bestiarium Zircense, Hungarian: zirci bestiárium; Országos Széchényi Könyvtár Cod. Lat. 506) is a 15th-century Hungarian illuminated manuscript copy of a medieval bestiary, a book describing the appearance and habits of a number of familiar and exotic animals, both real and legendary. The animals' characteristics are frequently allegorized, with the addition of a Christian moral. The Latin-language work was kept in the Cistercian Zirc Abbey, now it belongs to the property of the National Széchényi Library (OSZK).

== Manuscript ==
The Zirc Bestiary is a sixteen-page long illustrated collection of animals and beasts both real and imaginary, which is located in the last section (fol. 286 recto – 293 verso) of a codex compiled in the 15th century, which contains the sermons of Dominican preacher Johann Herolt (died 1468). The two works were bound and used together already in the 15th century, for the purpose of a collection of parables from the animal world. The codex was used by a certain Franciscan friar Thomas Szobocsinai, who originated from the fort of "Zabotchyna" (near Bjelovar). The friar preached in Slavonia, which is well reflected by the fact that the work contains scattered Hungarian and Croatian words. A side note from 1532 refers to the military campaigns of the Ottoman Empire into southern Hungary. The codex became part of the collection of the Franciscan monastery in Güssing (Németújvár, today Austria) by 1661 at the latest. It was transferred to the library of the Cistercian abbey of Zirc in 1919. Following the disbandment of the abbey during the Communist regime in 1950, the codex was handed over by the National Széchényi Library, which holds the manuscript its local memorial library in Zirc. OSZK published the codex's facsimile edition in 2016.

The manuscript is illuminated with pen drawings tinted with red and brown, whose primary purpose was visuality and illustration, so they do not represent artistic value. According to art historian Anna Boreczky, the Zirc Bestiary belongs to the second family of medieval bestiaries, which contains a shortened version of Physiologus and Isidore of Seville's Etymologiae regarding the subject.

== Content ==
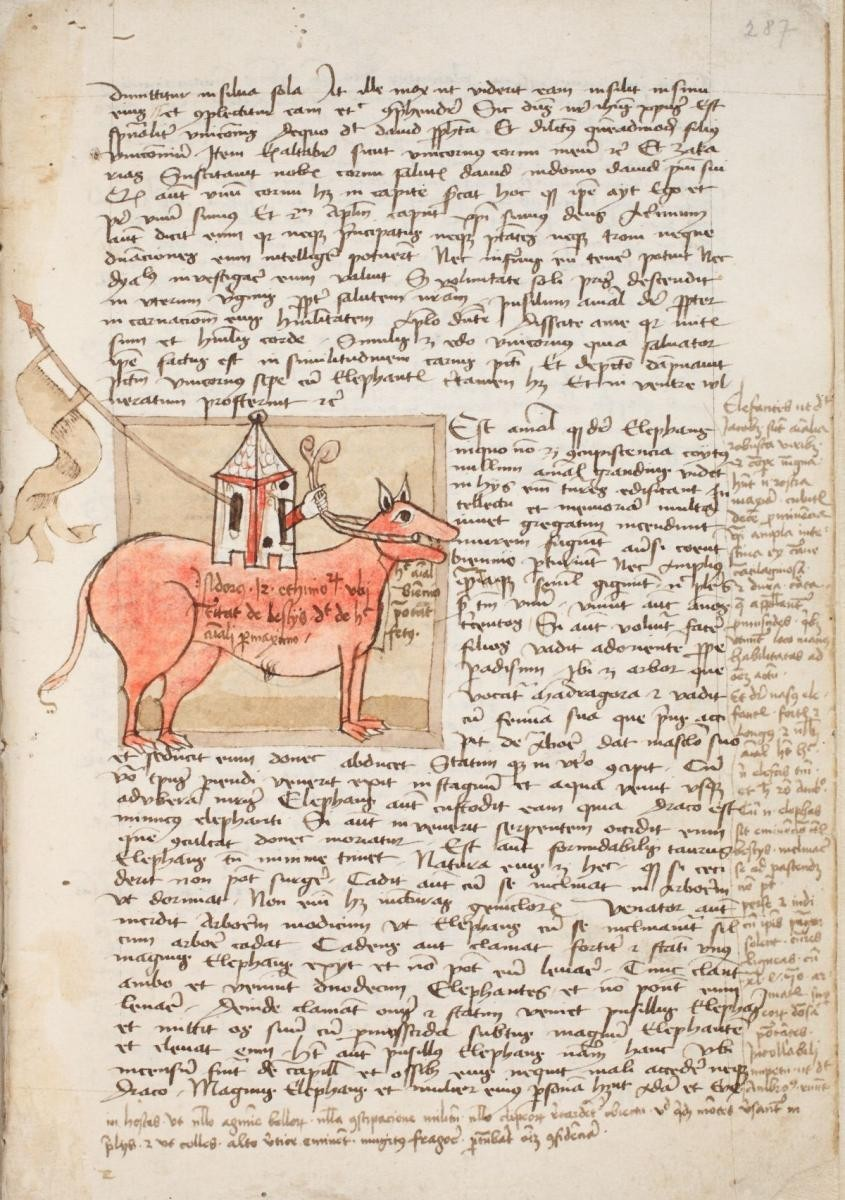
Elephant (fol. 287r)

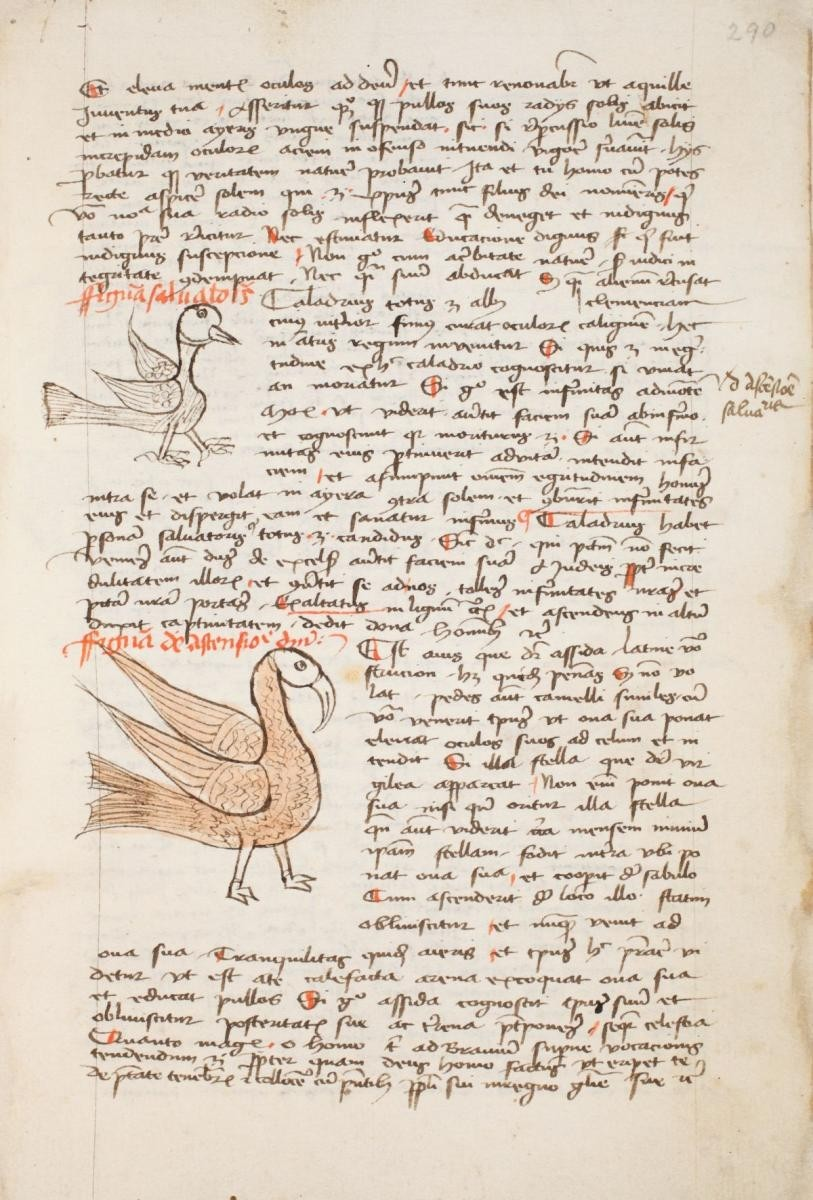
Caladrius and ostrich (fol. 290r)

The bestiary features the following animals:

1. Fol. 286r: lion (leo, ÿeger), panther (panthera, hyus)
2. Fol. 286v: antelope (antalops), unicorn (unicornis)
3. Fol. 287r: elephant (elephans)
4. Fol. 287v: beaver (castor), mountain goat (ibex), monkey (simia)
5. Fol. 288r: deer (cervus), goat (caper), she-goat (caprea), crocodile (cocodrillus)
6. Fol. 288v: fox (vulpes), wolf (lupus)
7. Fol. 289r: dog (canes), weasel (mustela)
8. Fol. 289v: ant (formica), eagle (aquila)
9. Fol. 290r: caladrius (caladrius), ostrich (assida)
10. Fol. 290v: stork (ciconia), coot (fulica), phoenix (fenix)
11. Fol. 291r: hoopoe (epops), pelican (pellicanus), owl (noctua)
12. Fol. 291v: siren (siren), gray partridge (perdix), dove (columba)
13. Fol. 292r: peridexion tree (perindens), snake (serpens)
14. Fol. 292v: Solomon on the throne
15. Fol. 293r: hyena (hyaena)
16. Fol. 293v: rooster (gallus), cobra (aspis), hydrus (hydrus), salamander (salamandra)
