= Vendel Endrédy =

Hungarian monk

Vendel Endrédy O.Cist. (January 19, 1895, in Fertőendréd, Hungary – December 29, 1981, in Pannonhalma) was a Hungarian monk, and the abbot of Zirc, Pilis-Paszto and St. Gotthard abbeys and abbot president of the Zirc Congregation 1939–1981.

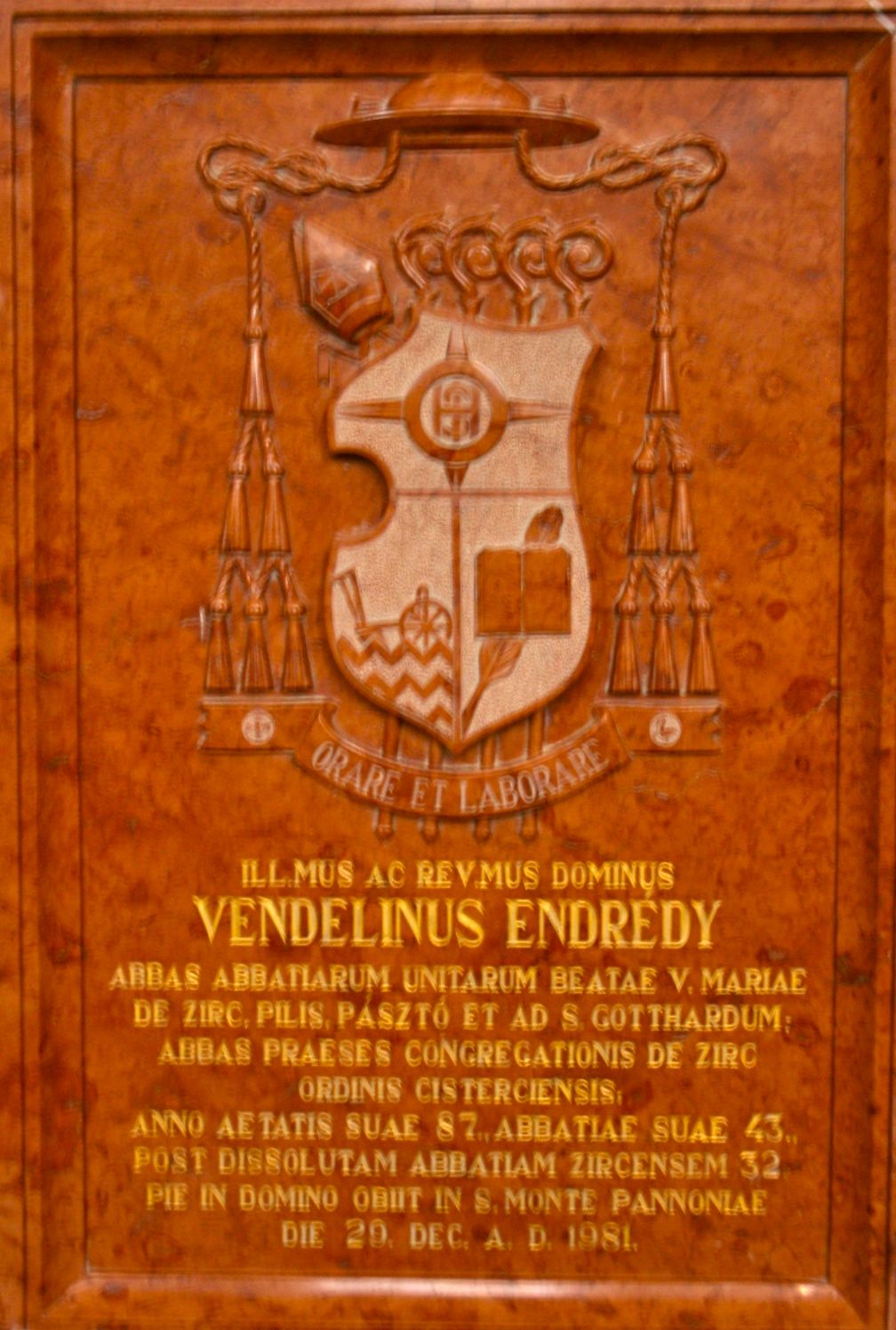
The commemorative plaque in Zirc Abbey.

== Life ==
He was the fourth of ten children and grew up in a farming family in the Hungarian county of Győr-Moson-Sopron. He attended a school run by Benedictines in Győr and received the Cistercian habit at Zirc Abbey in 1917.

Endrédy studied theology, mathematics and physics; after receiving his teaching certificate in 1922 he became a teacher at the Cistercian school in Budapest. In 1938 he became principal and a year later, in 1939, he was elected abbot of Zirc. As abbot, he initiated subsidized land acquisition for agricultural workers and education. During the war the monastery and its schools suffered severe losses and in 1948 the Communist regime took over all five of the abbey's schools. Endrédy fled to Rome in November 1948 but soon returned to Hungary, fully aware that he would be incarcerated by the Communists. Upon his return, he brought a message from Pope Pius XII to Kardinal Mindszenty, who had been placed under house arrest on December 26, 1948, and who had befriended Endredy.

On October 25, 1950, after not only the Cistercians' schools but also their monasteries had gone into Communist hands, Abbot Vendel was the last to leave his monastery and was arrested four days later in Budapest. Torture followed, and in 1951 Endrédy was sentenced to 14 years in prison. Six years he spent in isolation. In 1957 he was transferred to a home for aged clerics in Pannonhalma, where he died in 1981. His requiem took place in Pannonhalma Archabbey; his grave is in the Abbey Church at Zirc.

== Bibliography ==
- Wendelin Endrédy: Prison Memoirs, in: Thomas Pruit (ed.), Cistercians in Texas, the 1998 Jubilee (Dallas 1998), p. 114-129.
- Kálmán Kulcsár: Systemwechsel in Ungarn 1988–1990. – Frankfurt : Vittorio Klostermann, 1997 – p. 289
- Agnes Timár (ed.): Wege und Irrwege der katholischen Kirche Ungarns in der Zeit der Verfolgung durch die Kommunisten. – Berlin : Pro Business, 2009
- Endrédy Vendel Kálmán, in: Magyar Katolikus Lexikon
- Endrédy Kálmán Vendel, Hadarits, in: Magyar Életrajzi Lexikon 1000–1990
