= Our Lady of Spring Bank Abbey =

Historic Cistercian monastery in Wisconsin

Abbey of Our Lady of Spring Bank
- Monasterium B.M.V. ad Fontem
- Location within Wisconsin Location within the United States
- Interactive map of Abbey of Our Lady of Spring Bank

Monastery information
- Order: Cistercian
- Established: 1928
- Disestablished: 2011
- Mother house: Hauterive Abbey
- Dedication: Blessed Virgin Mary
- Diocese: La Crosse

Architecture
- Functional status: closed

Site
- Coordinates: 43°55′20″N 90°42′46″W

The Abbey of Our Lady of Spring Bank, founded in 1928, was an American monastery of monks of the Cistercian Common Observance in Wisconsin. The abbey was the first monastery of the Order to be established in the United States. The community was closed in 2011.

== History ==
In the years following World War I, at the instigation of the Abbot General of the order, the project was conceived of establishing the first monastery of the Order in the United States. While originally envisioned as a foundation of Wettingen-Mehrerau Abbey in Austria, eventually Cistercian monks from several Austrian, Dutch, and Swiss abbeys volunteered to undertake the endeavor.

In looking for a place to build their monastery, the monks received an invitation from Sebastian Gebhard Messmer, the Swiss-born Archbishop of Milwaukee, to establish themselves there. Arriving in 1928, the monks settled in Oconomowoc, a suburb of Milwaukee. There they founded the Monastery of Our Lady of Spring Bank, following the ancient Cistercian practice of dedicating their monasteries to the Blessed Virgin Mary under the title of the locale in which they live. At first the community operated under the direct oversight of the Abbot General himself, but responsibility for this was soon transferred to Hauterive Abbey in Switzerland. The monastery began to flourish and was soon raised to the status of an independent abbey.

Following World War II, the abbey became a place of refuge for Cistercian monks from Eastern Europe, especially for those from Zirc Abbey in Hungary, which was closed by Communist authorities in 1950. These monks eventually found a home in Texas, where they established the Abbey of Our Lady of Dallas.

In 1985 the community relocated to Sparta, Wisconsin, where they acquired some 600 acres of land, which was divided into forest lands and agricultural tracts leased to local farmers. A new monastery was built to accommodate 20 monks. Membership in the community, however, stayed around half that for much of the subsequent era. Like most monasteries, Spring Bank Abbey struggled to find ways to support itself; the abbey made news when it announced plans to open a gourmet restaurant. Under the leadership of an administrative prior, Bernard McCoy, the abbey launched a discount printing and toner operation, known as LaserMonks. Profits from this endeavor reached into the millions of dollars and McCoy became widely known in the business world and the media.

By 2010, profits from these enterprises had begun to diminish severely and the business was closed the following year. In 2011, the monastic chapter voted to dissolve the abbey.
