= Mauro-Giuseppe Lepori =

Swiss abbot of the Cistercian Order

The Reverend Lord Mauro-Giuseppe Lepori OCist
- Abbas Generalis Cisterciensis
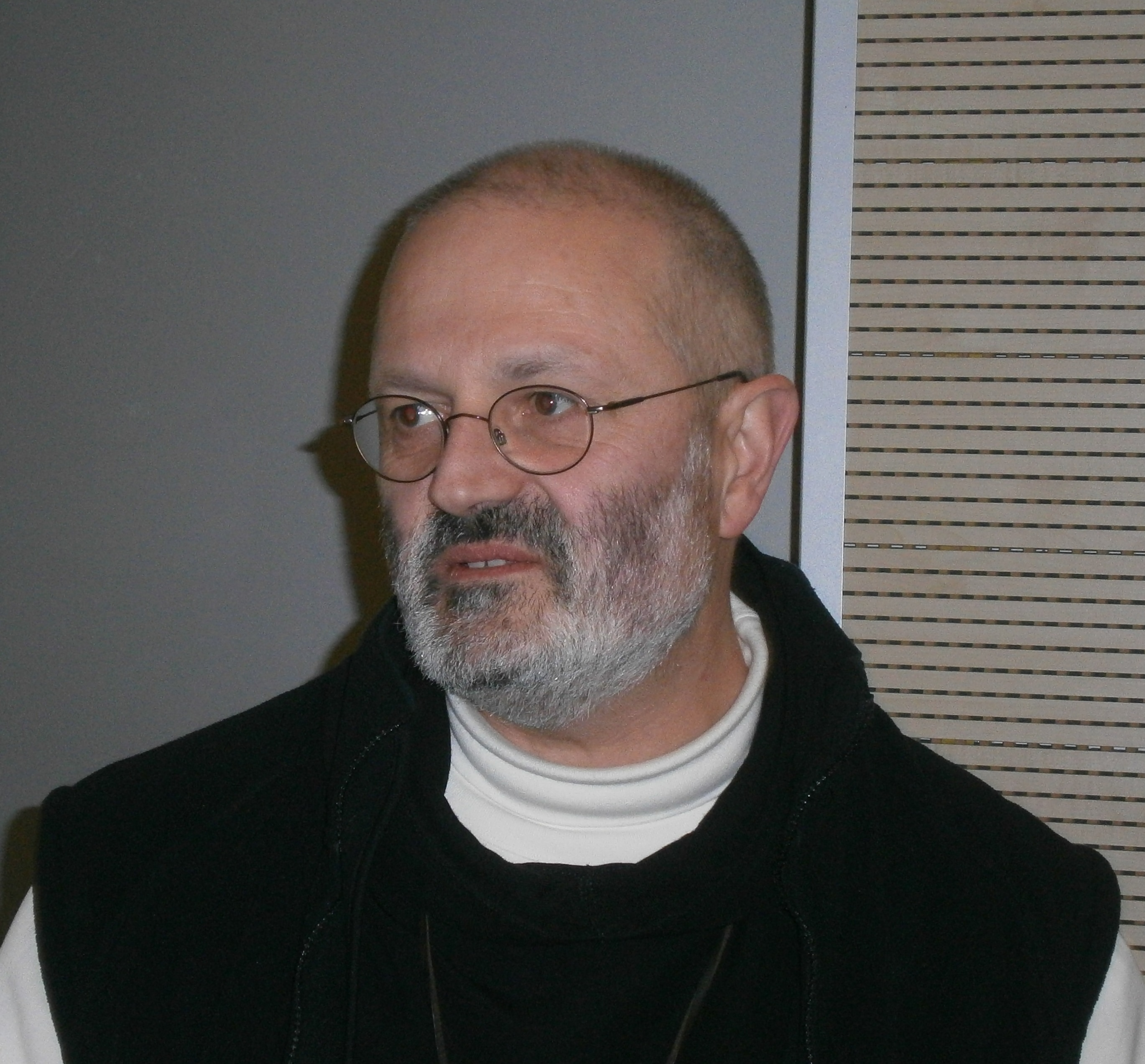
- Church: Roman Catholic
- Predecessor: Maurus Esteva Alsina
- Other post: Abbot of Hauterive

Orders
- Ordination: 1994

Personal details
- Born: 1959 (age 66–67)

Heraldic Crest

Mauro-Giuseppe Lepori (b. 1959) is a Swiss Roman Catholic monk. He became Abbot General of the Cistercian order in 2010.

He entered in 1984 Hauterive Abbey and became priest in 1990. He was between 1990 and 1994 novice master in this abbey. He was elected and ordained in 1994 as Abbot of Hauterive and in 2010 as 82nd abbot-general in succession of Maurus Esteva Alsina OCist.

== Works ==
- L'amato presente. L'esperienza della misericordia. – Genova-Milano : Marietti, 2002
- Simone chiamato Pietro. Sui passi di un uomo alla sequela di Dio. – Genova-Milano : Marietti, 2004
- Il mistero è pasquale. Omelie per il Triduo Sacro 1995–2004. – Genova-Milano : Marietti, 2006
- Fu invitato anche Gesù. Conversazoini sulla vocazione famigliare. – Siena : Cantagalli, 2006
- Sorpresi dalla gratuità. – Siena : Cantagalli, 2007
- La vita si è manifestata. Omelie sull'attesa, l'avvenimento e la manifestazione dell'Incarnazione del Signore. – Genova-Milano : Marietti, 2008
- Simon Petrus: Gedanken aus dem Zisterzienserkloster. – Freiburg : Paulus, 2008
- Simon Called Peter. In the Company of a Man in Search of God. – San Francisco : Ignatius, 2010. – ISBN 9781586172718
