= Our Lady of Dallas Abbey =

Cistercian monastery in Irving, Texas

Abbey of Our Lady of Dallas
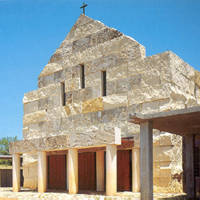
- Interactive map of Abbey of Our Lady of Dallas

Monastery information
- Order: Cistercian
- Established: February 19, 1955
- Mother house: Zirc Abbey
- Diocese: Dallas

People
- Abbot: The Right Rev. Peter Verhalen, O.Cist.

Architecture
- Status: active
- Functional status: monastery and school

Site
- Coordinates: 32°51′14″N 96°55′20″W
- Website: www.cistercian.org/abbey/

The Abbey of Our Lady of Dallas is a Cistercian monastery founded in 1955 in Irving, Texas. The monks of the abbey operate Cistercian Preparatory School for boys. As of 2018, it is the only Cistercian monastery in the USA; there is a Canadian Abbey (Our Lady of Nazareth) in Rougemont, Quebec.

== History ==
The Cistercians were founded in France in the 11th century as a reform within the Benedictine movement. They spread rapidly across Europe. After the French Revolution, the monasteries in Western Europe were mostly dissolved and the monks and nuns scattered. In Eastern Europe, however, under the patronage of the Habsburg dynasty, they were allowed to continue to operate, but only if they provided education.

After coming into power in Hungary in 1950, the Communist authorities disbanded the Cistercian Abbey of Zirc, first founded in 1182 and refounded in the mid 17th century. Its vast land holdings, five schools, and numerous parishes were confiscated. Of the 215 displaced monks, more than thirty successfully fled the country, seeking refuge in other Cistercian monasteries in Western Europe and in the only Cistercian monastery in the United States, Our Lady of Spring Bank Abbey, then located in Oconomowoc, Wisconsin.

In 1954, Thomas K. Gorman, Bishop of the Roman Catholic Diocese of Dallas, was in the process of establishing what was to become the University of Dallas. While inviting several local religious orders to assist in this enterprise, he also invited the refugee Cistercian monks in Wisconsin, drawing upon their long history as educators. The monks agreed and soon arrived in Dallas, receiving formal establishment by the Holy See of a monastery on February 19, 1955. Its canonical status was that of a dependent of Zirc Abbey. When the doors of the university opened in September 1956, nine monks served on the faculty. A small monastery was soon built on the university campus grounds and dedicated by Gorman in 1958.

The monastery became independent of Hungary on March 21, 1961, with the election of the first prior, Anselm Nagy. The monastic community opened the preparatory school, modelled after the Cistercian schools of Hungary, in September of the following year. The community continued to develop and was soon raised to the status of an abbey, with Nagy being elected the first abbot and installed on January 4, 1964.

The monastic complex continued to expand as the abbey began to receive American-born candidates in the 1970s. This led to the expansion of the school and the building of the abbey church, completed in 1992 to designs by Gary Cunningham. Today the monks work at both their own secondary school and at the University of Dallas, serving both as teachers and priests. Monks of the abbey also provide pastoral assistance at various parishes in the Dallas and Fort Worth Dioceses.
