= Ferenc Polikárp Zakar =

Hungarian abbot

The Reverend Lord Ferenc Polikárp Zakar OCist
- Abbas Generalis Cisterciensis
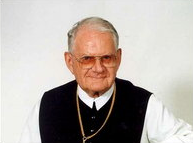
- Predecessor: Sighard Kleiner
- Successor: Maurus Esteva Alsina
- Other post: abbot of Zirc Abbey

Personal details
- Born: 8 June 1930 Zmajevo, Yugoslavia
- Died: 17 September 2012 (aged 82) Budapest, Hungary
- Denomination: Catholic

Ferenc Polikárp Zakar Ocist. (8 June 1930 – 17 September 2012) was a Hungarian abbot of the Cistercians of Common Observance. Between 1985-1995 he was in office as 80the General Abbot, and was succeeded by Maurus Esteva Alsina.

Zakar was born in Zmajevo, Yugoslavia. He served as abbot of Zirc Abbey from 1996 to 2010. He died, aged 82, in Budapest, Hungary.
