= Zirc Abbey =

Cistercian abbey in Zirc, Hungary

Coordinates: 47°15′44″N 17°52′30″E

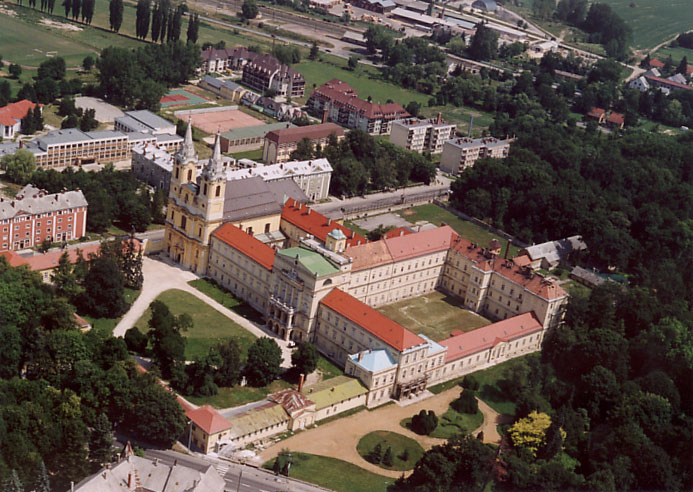
- Zirc Abbey from the air
- Interactive map of Zirc Abbey

Monastery information
- Other names: Zircensis, Boccon
- Order: Cistercian
- Established: 1182
- Disestablished: 1950
- Reestablished: 1989
- Mother house: Kutjevo Abbey
- Diocese: Diocese of Veszprém

People
- Founder: Béla III

Zirc Abbey, formerly also Zircz Abbey, also known as Zircensis or Boccon, is a Cistercian abbey, situated in Zirc in the Diocese of Veszprém, Hungary.

== History ==
=== First period ===
The early history of the monastery is obscure as regards to both the names and dates; often the monastery is referred to under both Zirc and Boccon, whether they were separate abbeys cannot be definitely determined. It seems most probable that the foundation was made by Béla III, King of Hungary (1182), as the monastic domain was formerly royal property. Besides this grant, on which now stands the city of Zirc, many other donations were made to the nascent abbey. In 1232 the foundation of Kutjevo Abbey (in today's Croatia) was made from Zirc.

In the second half of the 15th century, the abbey was clearly in crisis. When Miklós Maglódy was appointed as abbot in 1511, the monastery was already in ruins with only a handful of monks living there. In the 1530s, neighboring landlords occupied the abbey's estates and looted the monastery. By 1538, the abbey was abandoned. The crisis was not, however, due to the Turkish invasion, since they arrived in the region only in 1552.

=== Second period ===
In the seventeenth century (1609) it was acquired by Canon Mihály Monoszlay. Thenceforth it remained the property of ecclesiastics, and in 1659 it was given to Matthew Kolweiß, Abbot of the Cistercian Lilienfeld Abbey, who appointed Márton Újfalusy its abbot in 1660, thus reviving it. He was in office until he was murdered in 1678. The abbot of Lilienfeld managed the recovery and resettlement of the estates from Pápa until 1698, when Lilienfeld finally transferred ownership of Zirc to the Silesian (German-speaking) abbey of Heinrichau in 1700. Monks from Heinrichau restored the monastic buildings and the church. At first, the German monks lived in Pápa; they relocated to Zirc only in 1726. Their new abbey church at Zirc was consecrated in 1745.

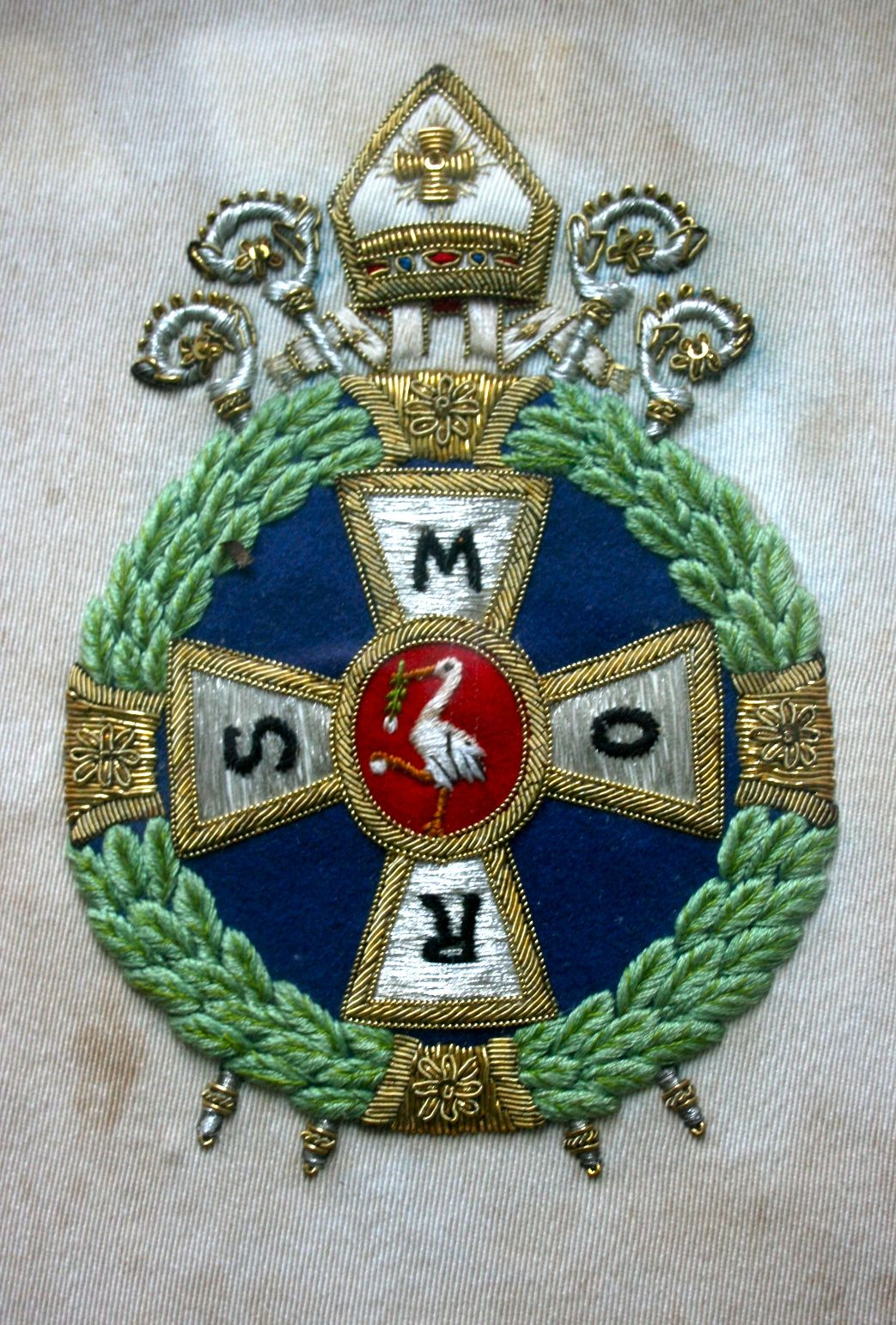
The abbey's seal

In 1810 the community was expelled, as were so many other monasteries in the region, but restored in 1814 under Abbot Antonius Dreta; now the abbey prospered. Under his administration, the abbeys at Pilis and Pásztó were united to Zirc, as was Szentgotthárd Abbey in 1878. In 1923, the Congregation of Zirc was established.

Heinrichau had been dissolved in 1810, but not Zirc. Zirc had operated practically independently of Heinrichau from 1802, since the Austro-Hungarian authorities had forbidden personal contact between the two. Antal Dréta, who was the prior of Zirc from 1803, was made abbot of Zirc after Gloger, the abbot of Heinrichau, died in 1814.

After World War II and the Soviet takeover of Hungary, many of the monks gradually escaped the country. A large number of them went to Wisconsin (USA) and served at Spring Bank in Sparta, Wisconsin, founded by Dutch monks in 1928. By 1956, however, a small group of these Hungarian Cistercians left Wisconsin to found Our Lady of Dallas in Irving, Dallas County, Texas.

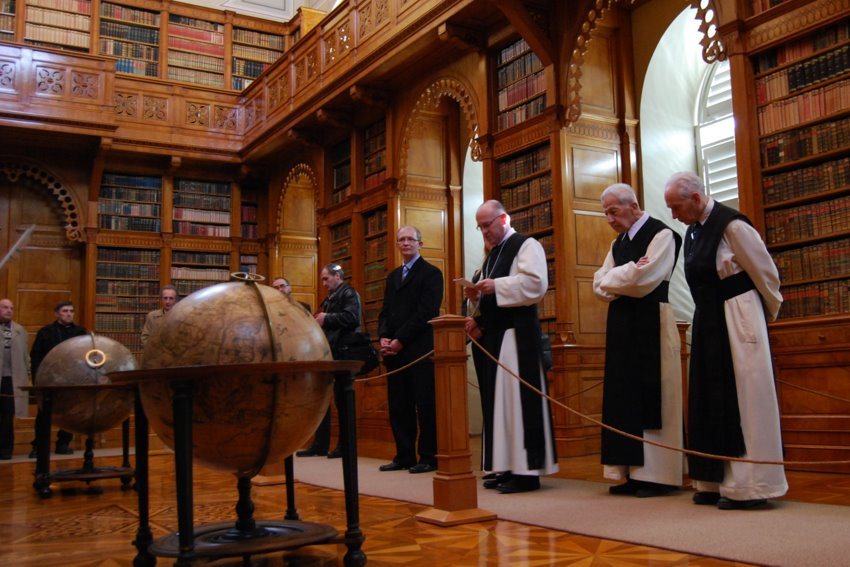
Treasures from the abbey on display at a local museum.

Zirc Abbey was dissolved in 1950, and its church became a parish church. The monastery was re-established in 1989 and maintains residences in Eger, Baja, Budapest, Pécs and Székesfehérvár.

=== Recent decades ===
The suppressed abbey was led by Vendel Endrédy from 1939 until 1981; Abbot Károly Kerekes was made abbot during a ceremony at Stams Abbey in Austria and led the dispersed community as far as that was possible in the years 1987–1996. Polikárp Zakar, formerly the Abbot General of the Cistercian Order, was made abbot in 1996 and stayed in office until 2010. Sixtus Dékány led the abbey as abbot 2011–2017 but withdrew from office prematurely. Bernát Bérczi served as Prior-Administrator for a year, became abbot in 2018, and was suspended by the Dicastery for Institutes of Consecrated Life in 2023. Cistercian Abbot General Mauro-Giuseppe Lepori was appointed Pontifical Commissioner for Zirc.

== Literature ==
- Remig Békefi: Geschichte des Zisterzienserordens in Ungarn von 1142–1814, in: Cistercienser Chronik 12 (1900), pp. 1–14, 33–43, 65–71, 97–103, 129–134.
- Remig Békefi: Geschichte des Cistercienser-Ordens in Ungarn von 1814–1896, in: Cistercienser Chronik 13 (1901), pp. 65–79, 97–105, 129–137, 161–167.
- Eszter Cúthné Gyóni: A History of the Cistercian Abbey of Zirc: Restrictions, legal actions, retaliations and the modus of survival, in: Christen und totalitäre Herrschaft in den Ländern Ostmittel-und Südosteuropas von 1945 bis in die 1960er Jahre, ed. Rainer Bendel and Robert Pech (Böhlau 2023), pp. 273–292 (English).
- Ambrosius Schneider: Zirc, in: Lexikalische Übersicht der Männerklöster der Cistercienser im deutschen Sprach- und Kulturraum, in: Ambrosius Schneider et al, eds.: Die Cistercienser – Geschichte, Geist, Kunst. Cologne: Wienand Verlag 1985, p. 699, ISBN 3-87909-132-3

== See also ==
- Zirc Bestiary

== Sources and external links ==
- Cistercensi: Zircz (1182-1527)
- Cistercensi: Zirc II (1659-1814)
- Cistercensi: Kutjevo, otherwise Gotó
- Zirc, the Hungarian sister of Himmerod Abbey (in German)
- Catholic Encyclopedia (1913): Zircz
