= Bego =

Bego can refer to:

- Bego (given name)
- Daihatsu Be‣go, a Japanese mini SUV
- Mont Bégo, a mountain in the Mercantour massif of the Maritime Alps, in southern France
- Vojislav Bego (1923–1999), Croatian electrical engineer
