= Begon (disambiguation) =

Begon is a Sara iron mining/ironworks site in Chad.

Begon or Bégon may also refer to:

== People ==
- Bégon, French form of Bego (given name)
- Michel Bégon (naturalist) (1638–1710), French naturalist and administrator after whom begonias were named
- Michel Bégon de la Picardière, his son; an intendant of New France
- Claude-Michel Bégon de la Cour, French colonial officer in Quebec
- Antoinette Begon, wife of Étienne Pascal

== Places ==
- Causse-Bégon, a commune in the Gard department in southern France
