= Begoña (disambiguation) =

Begoña is a neighbourhood and urban district in Bilbao, Spain.

It can also refer to:

- Begoña (name), a given name in the Basque country and Spanish-speaking regions
- Begoña (Madrid Metro), a railway station on Madrid's rapid transit system.

== See also ==
- Begon (disambiguation)
