= Representation of animals in Western medieval art =

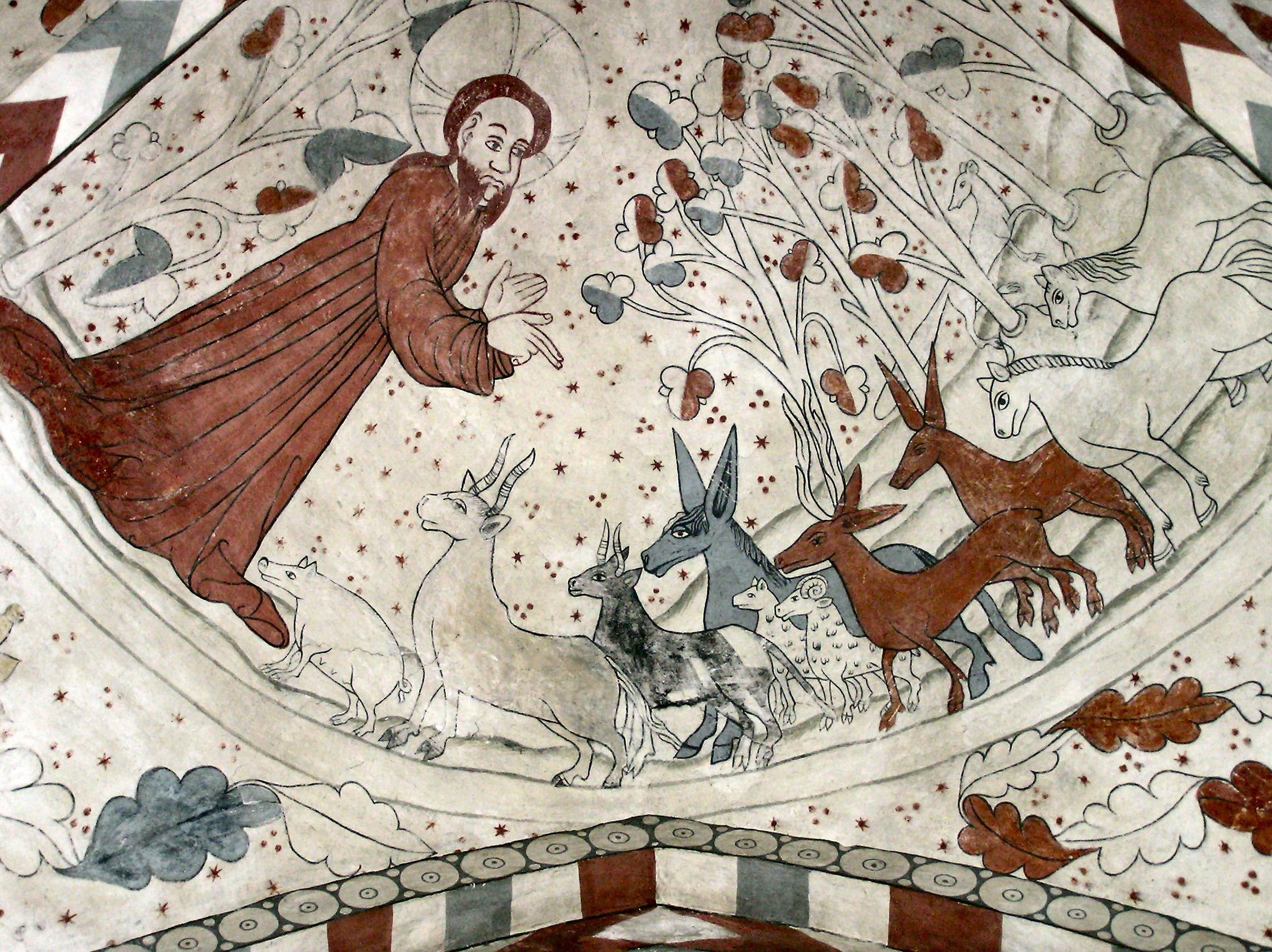
God creating animals, 1480, frescoes in Vittskövle church, Sweden

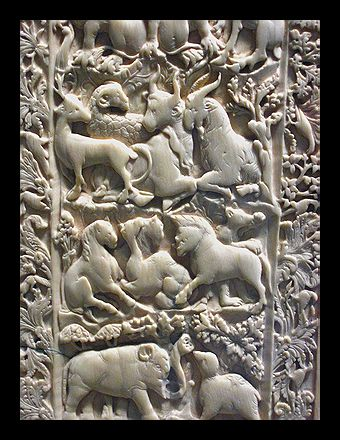
Ivory "Earthly paradise" plaque circa 870–875, Louvre collections

Animal representation in Western medieval art is diverse in its artistic forms and animals depicted, whether real or imaginary. These medieval representations are influenced by Christianity: they are decorative and, at the same time, symbolic. In this period, animals can represent Creation, Good and Evil, God and the Devil. They were popular in churches, on stained glass windows, bas-reliefs, or paving stones, the only learning media for the illiterate who made up the majority of medieval society. Animals were sculpted on church capitals and ivory plaques, painted in manuscript illuminations and church frescoes, as well as in goldsmiths' and silversmiths' work, seals, tapestries, and stained-glass windows.

== Animals in the Middle Ages ==
The art of the Middle Ages was mainly religious, reflecting the relationship between God and man, created in His image. The animal often appears confronted or dominated by man, but a second current of thought stemming from Saint Paul and Aristotle, which developed from the 12th century onwards, includes animals and humans in the same community of living creatures.

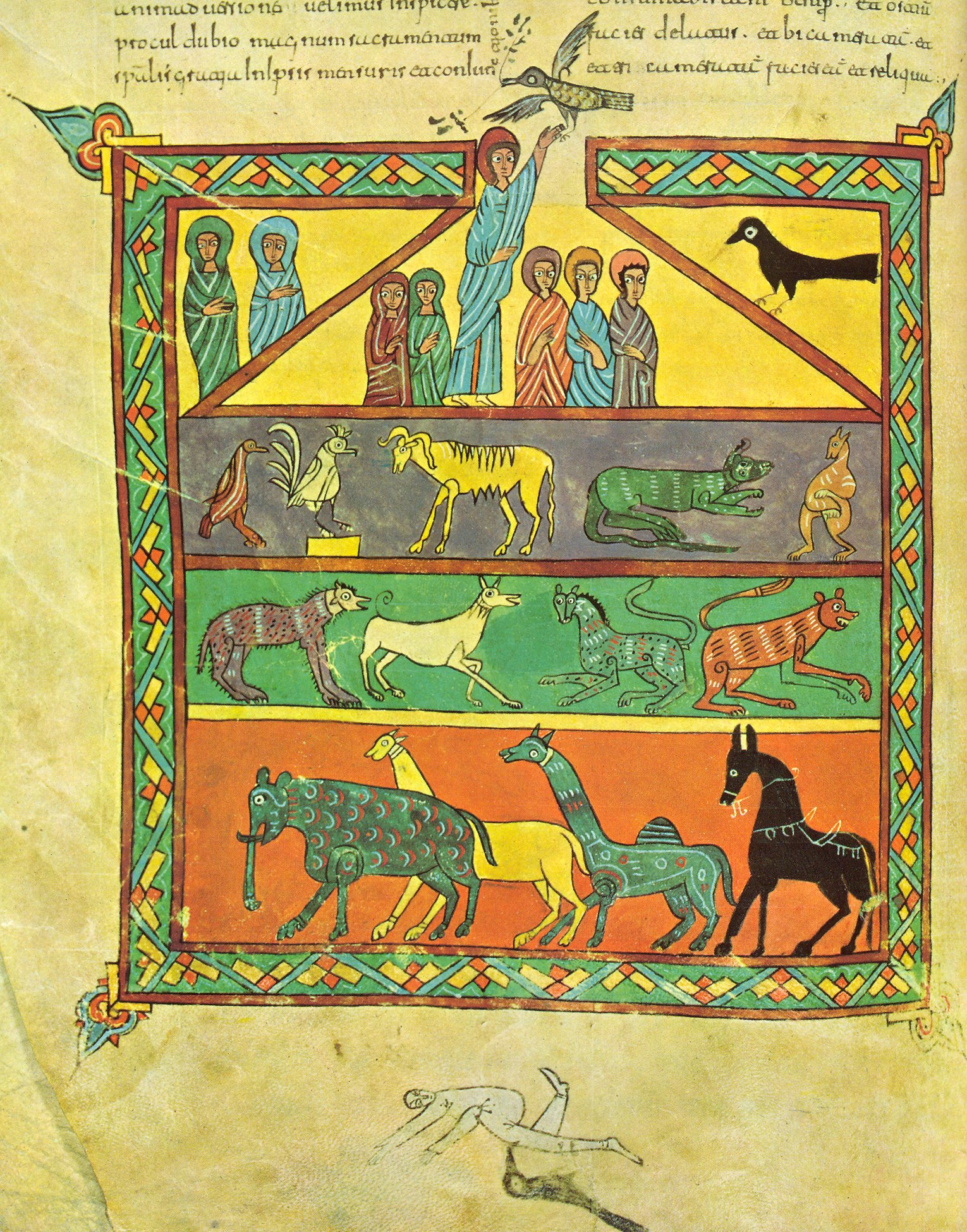
Urgell Beatus, Noah's Ark, c. 975

During the Christian era, the Church's commitment to eradicating paganism led to a revival of symbolic art. The animal becomes an allegory: the dove, for example, represents peace.

God's creature, the animal, helps man interpret the world, in a symbolic role, particularly represented in bestiaries. From the 13th century onwards, encyclopedias began to appear, partly due to the translation of Aristotle's works. The animal had its place in these inventories, which gradually shed their moralizations, and some started to touch on practical aspects of animal husbandry.

Animals were an active part of life in the Middle Ages, as evidenced by the depictions of the months in books of hours, as well as tales, fables, and satires, such as the novel of Renart, the novel of Fauvel and the fables of Marie de France.

=== Religion ===
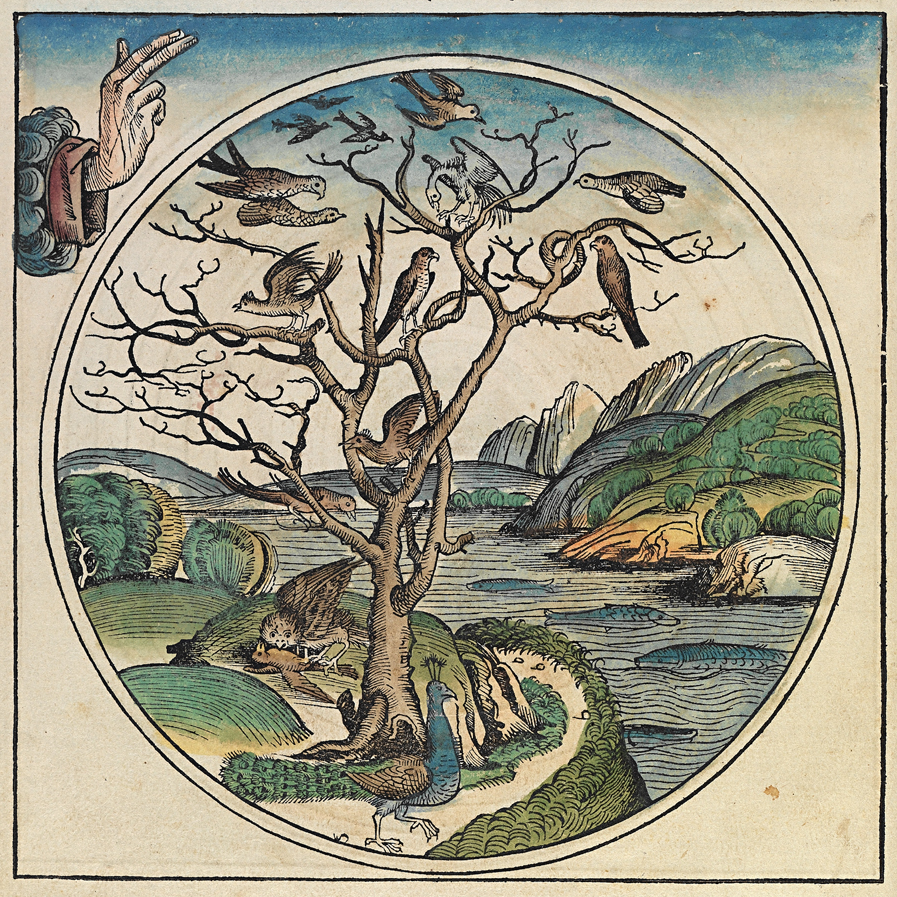
Chronicles of Nuremberg by Hartmann Schedel, folio 4 verso, incunable, 1493

The Christian story of animals begins with their creation as described in Genesis. In the first Genesis account, God creates the animals as ornaments of the world before creating man and woman in his image. The fish of the sea and the birds of the air are made on the fifth day, followed by the beasts of the earth on the sixth day. In the second Genesis account, God destinies the animals to help man. Adam names the animals, establishing his superiority over them in the Christian vision.

In the Christian religion, animals are also important in these stories:

- The Garden of Eden
- Noah's Ark
- The Apocalypse
- Golden legend

=== Literature ===
When describing fauna, the medieval man attached more importance to allegory and animal symbolism than to observation. Knowledge was passed on through ancient authors. Around the 12th century, the first taxonomy appeared in English bestiaries, distinguishing between quadrupeds, birds, fish, and reptiles. Then, from the 13th century onwards, notions of science and natural history began to develop.

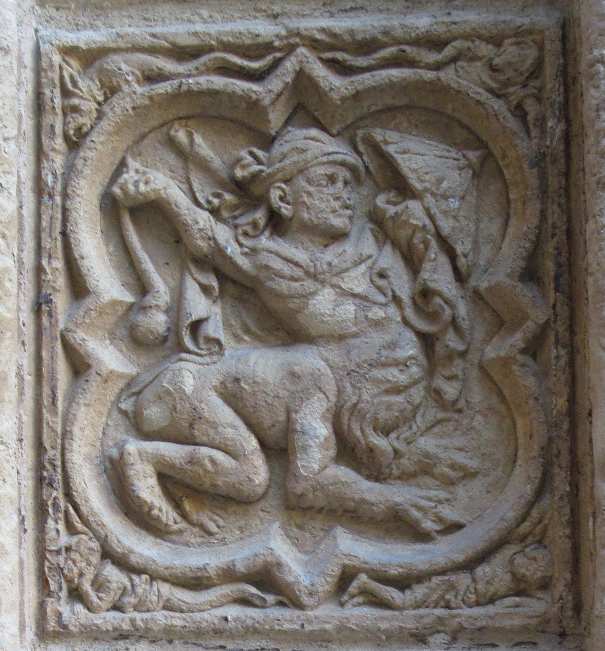
Hybrid figure from the northern portal of Rouen Cathedral (late 13th century)

In bestiary descriptions, the distinction between familiar and wild, common and exotic, real and imaginary animals is not taken into account. The very existence of imaginary animals, particularly those that appear in the Bible such as dragons and unicorns, was not called into question until much later: Edward Topsell still includes them in his History of Four-Footed Beasts (1607). Moreover, certain animals such as the crocodile may have been familiar to ancient authors, seeing as the Physiologus source of bestiaries was written near Alexandria.

The list of animals known in the Middle Ages includes a number of hybrid beings such as mermaids, centaurs, and the Bonnacon, a bull-headed horse with ram's horns. The presence of chimeras, animal representations that can go beyond named species, became popular, as seen on the northern portal of Rouen Cathedral, where over a hundred creatures do not appear to correspond to a known species.

=== Society ===
Representations of animals during the Middle Ages are also seen in hunting books, fables, and seals. Medieval seals were the medium on which many of the animals featured in medieval literature found their place. Birds, fish, mammals, and snakes populated these prints, as did the hybrid creatures mentioned above. Among these seals is that of Jean de Franquerue (12th century), which appears to feature a gargoyle, a man's head leaning against a horse's head and legs and an eagle's head, accompanied by a cinquefoil, on a field of crosses. The seal of Philip III of Burgundy also features two lions supporting the Duke's shield. As we can see from these examples, it is possible to infer that animal iconography was available and widespread in medieval society. In addition to its symbolic function, it also played a role in identity, the seal being man's image, his image, the one that extends, emblematizes, and symbolizes him, the one that is both himself and the double of himself.

== Evolution and influences of animal representations during the Middle Ages ==
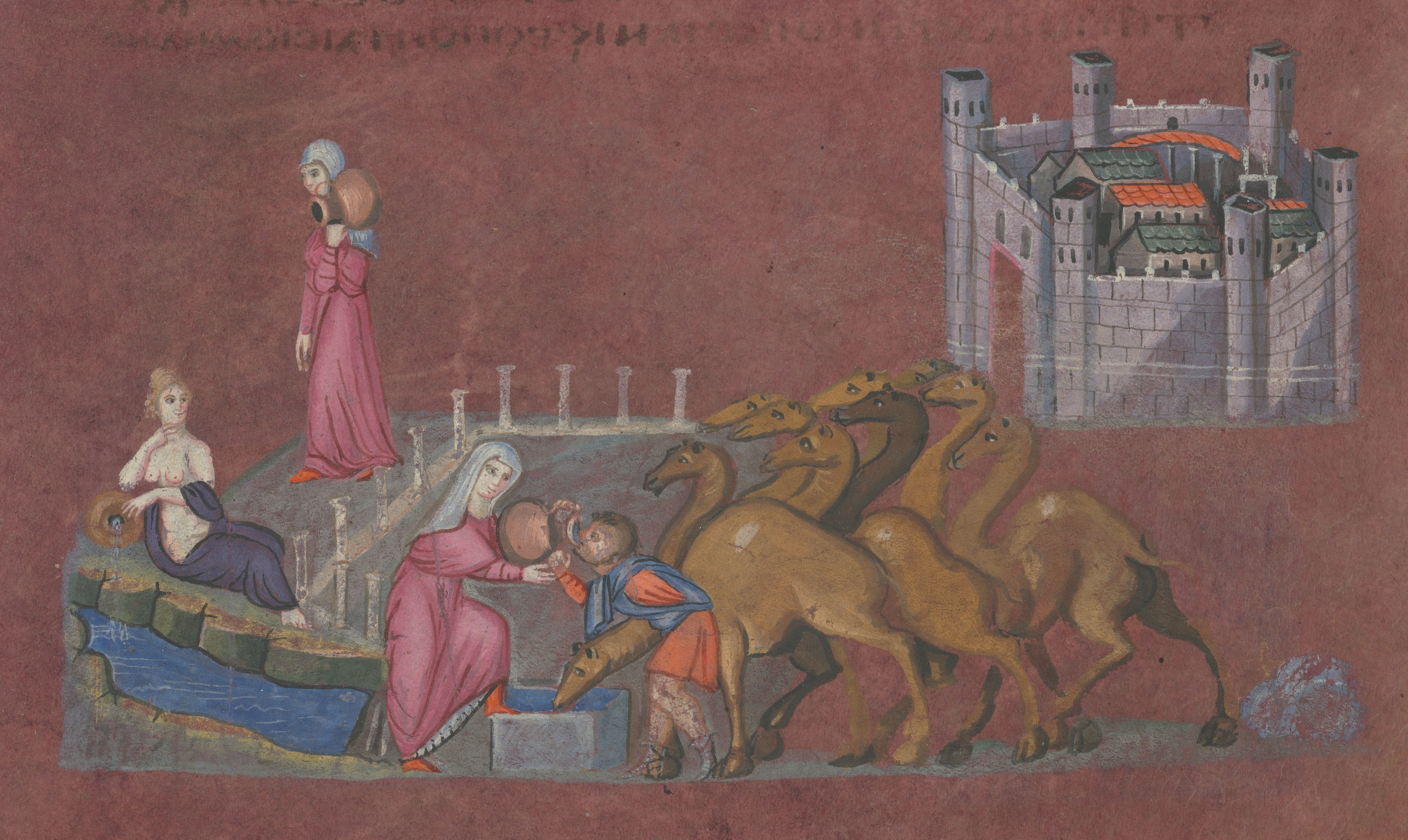
Vienna Genesis, Rebecca at the Well, late 6th century, Austrian National Library

Over the course of the Middle Ages, animal representation evolved from codified imagery derived from multiple influences to naturalistic representation, as illustrated by the life sketches made in the Visconti or Frederick II menagerie, such as Villard de Honnecourt's lion.

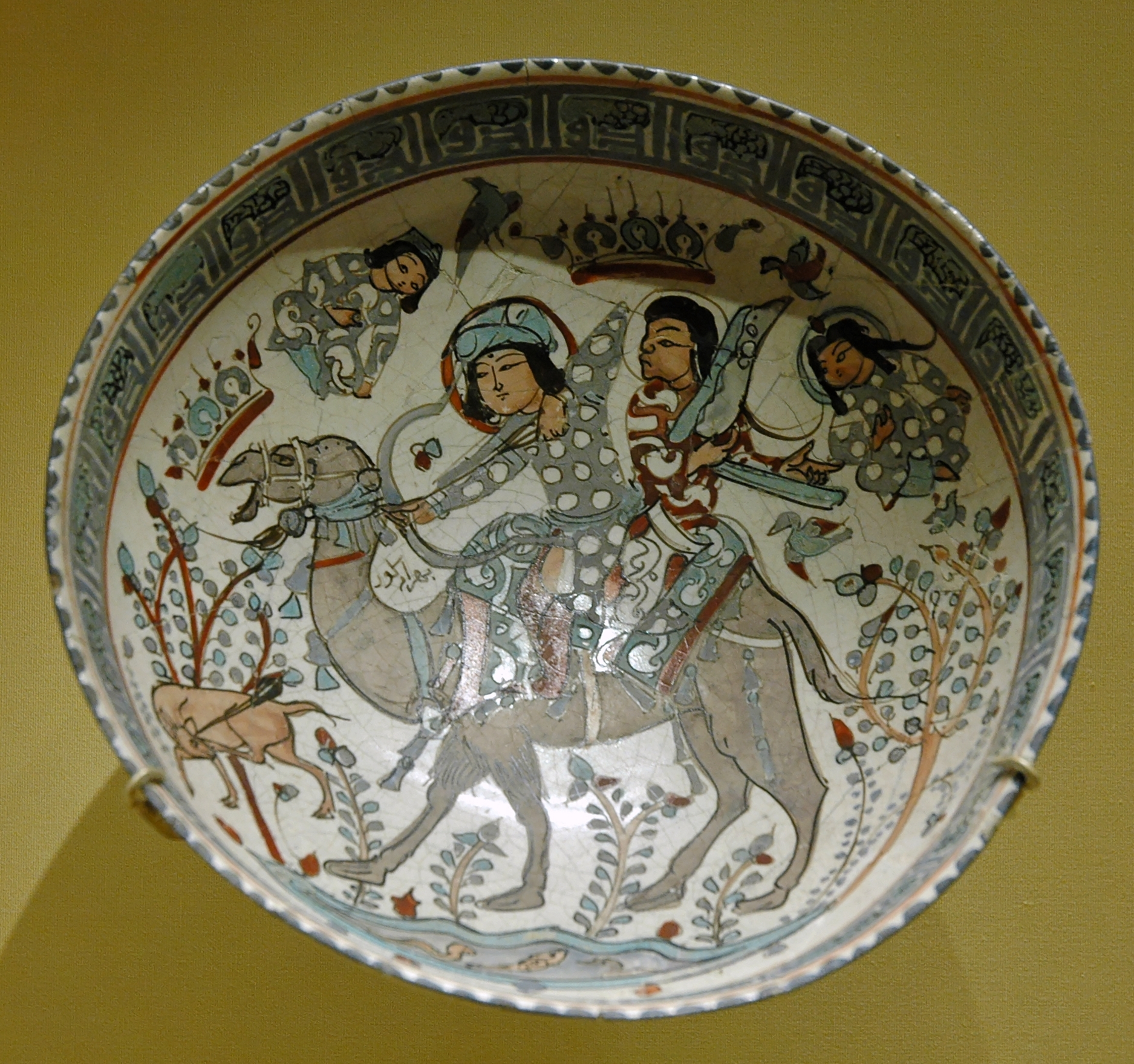
Bowl with Bahram Gûr, hero of the Shahnameh (Book of Kings) and Azadeh, the harp player. Iran, late 12th, early 13th century. Metropolitan Museum of Art (MET 57.36.14).

Most animal descriptions are based on the Physiologus, an ancient bestiary written in Greek in Alexandria in the 2nd or 3rd century, then translated into Latin in the 4th century. The West was also influenced by the Orient and dragons and griffins were grafted onto Western animals. Familiar animals are represented in particular through scenes of peasant life in 15th-century Books of Hours.

From the 9th century onwards, Muslim aniconism was respected for religious spaces, with rare exceptions, particularly Anatolian mosques. Figurative illustrations can be found in secular works, illuminated manuscripts, and ceramic art.

In Merovingian illumination, zoomorphic lettering appears. Fish and birds, for example, decorate the Gellone Sacramentary from the late 8th century.

=== Romanesque art ===
Romanesque artists drew inspiration from ancient pagan motifs, reinterpreting them according to the current thinking of the time. The meaning becomes religious and moral, sometimes resulting in a modification of ancient forms.

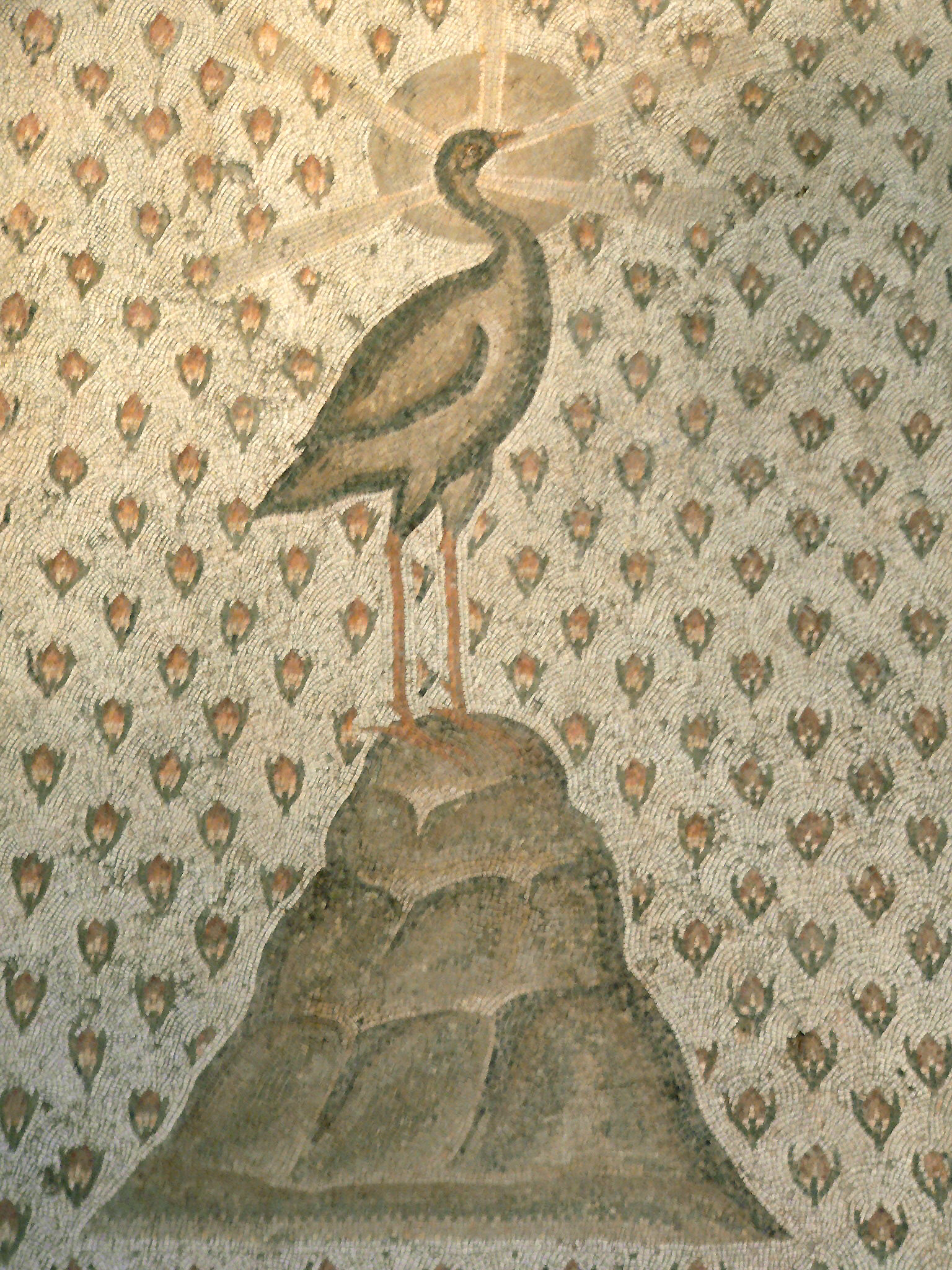
Phoenix mosaic, detail, Antioch, 6th century, Louvre Museum

In terms of meaning, the mermaid finds herself associated with lust. She retains her former appearance as a mermaid-bird with wings and talons, an image that Isidore of Seville justifies by saying that "love flies and claws". At the same time, the mermaid-fish motif appeared, the result of assimilation with tritons. It comes in two forms: single-tailed or bifid.

==== Cistercian art ====
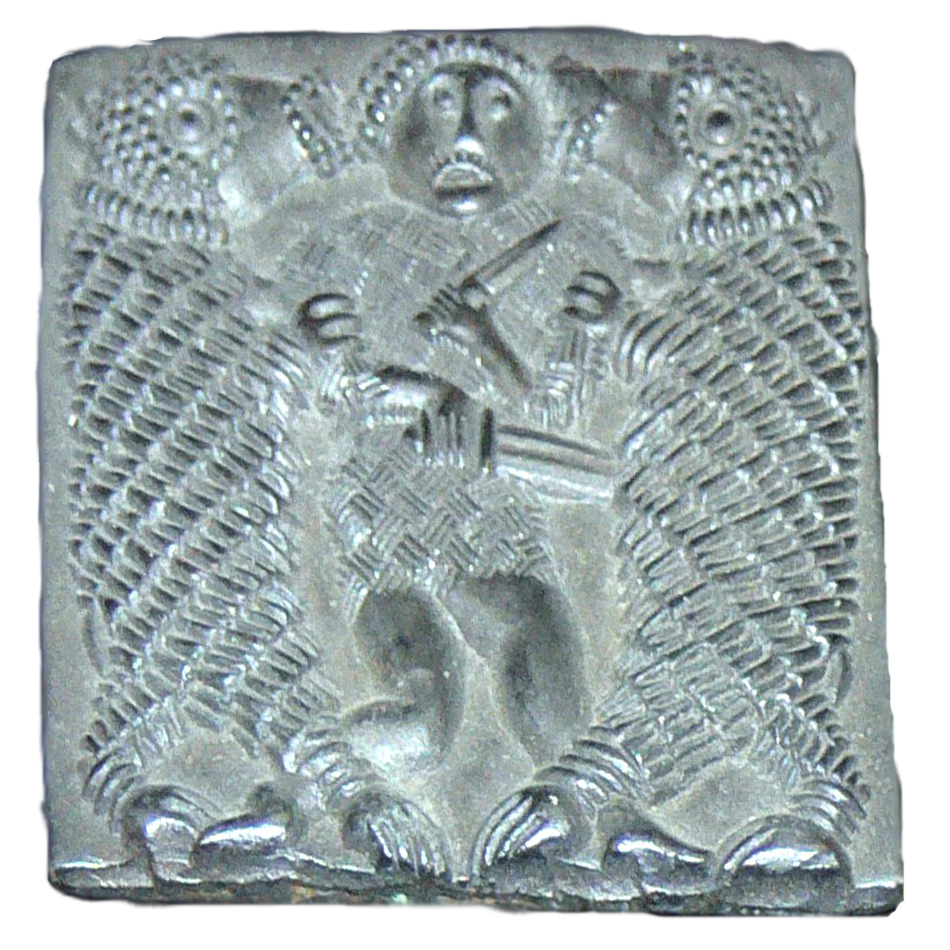
Man wrestling with two ferocious beasts, bronze fragment from Torslunda (Öland, Sweden), 7th century

An early work of Cistercian art, Étienne Harding's Bible consists of a first volume decorated with gilded initials and a second volume featuring illuminations. But with Saint Bernard, a more austere art form began to emerge. In 1140, he railed against cloister decorations, in particular, the carved bestiary: "But what do these ridiculous monsters, these horrible beauties and these beautiful horrors mean in your cloisters, where the monks do their reading? What's the point, in these places, of these foul apes, these ferocious lions, these chimerical centaurs, these half-human monsters, these variegated tigers, these soldiers who fight, and these hunters who give horn". (Note: Bernard de Clairveaux, Apologia, chapter XII, translation by Abbot Carpentier, 1866)

The Statutes of Cîteaux (1150–1152) proclaim: "We forbid the making of sculptures or paintings in our churches or other places of the monastery because while one looks, one often neglects the usefulness of a good meditation and the discipline of religious gravity". Cistercian art was then characterized by pared-down decorations, possibly featuring stylized vegetation. Gold was banned from manuscripts, and a different color could only be used for initials. Before the Gothic explosion, figuration gradually made a comeback, as in the modillions of Flaran Abbey, the decorations of Silvacane, and the cloister of Valmagne Abbey. Henri Focillon wrote that "the Cistercians expelled from religious art what remained of pomp and mystery".

=== Posterity ===
An early Renaissance painter, Hieronymus Bosch used animals and fantasy creatures in some of his works, particularly in The Garden of Delights. (Note: Triptych, c. 1505–1510, Prado Museum, Madrid) The artist used animals to criticize the society in which he lived.

== Animal symbology ==
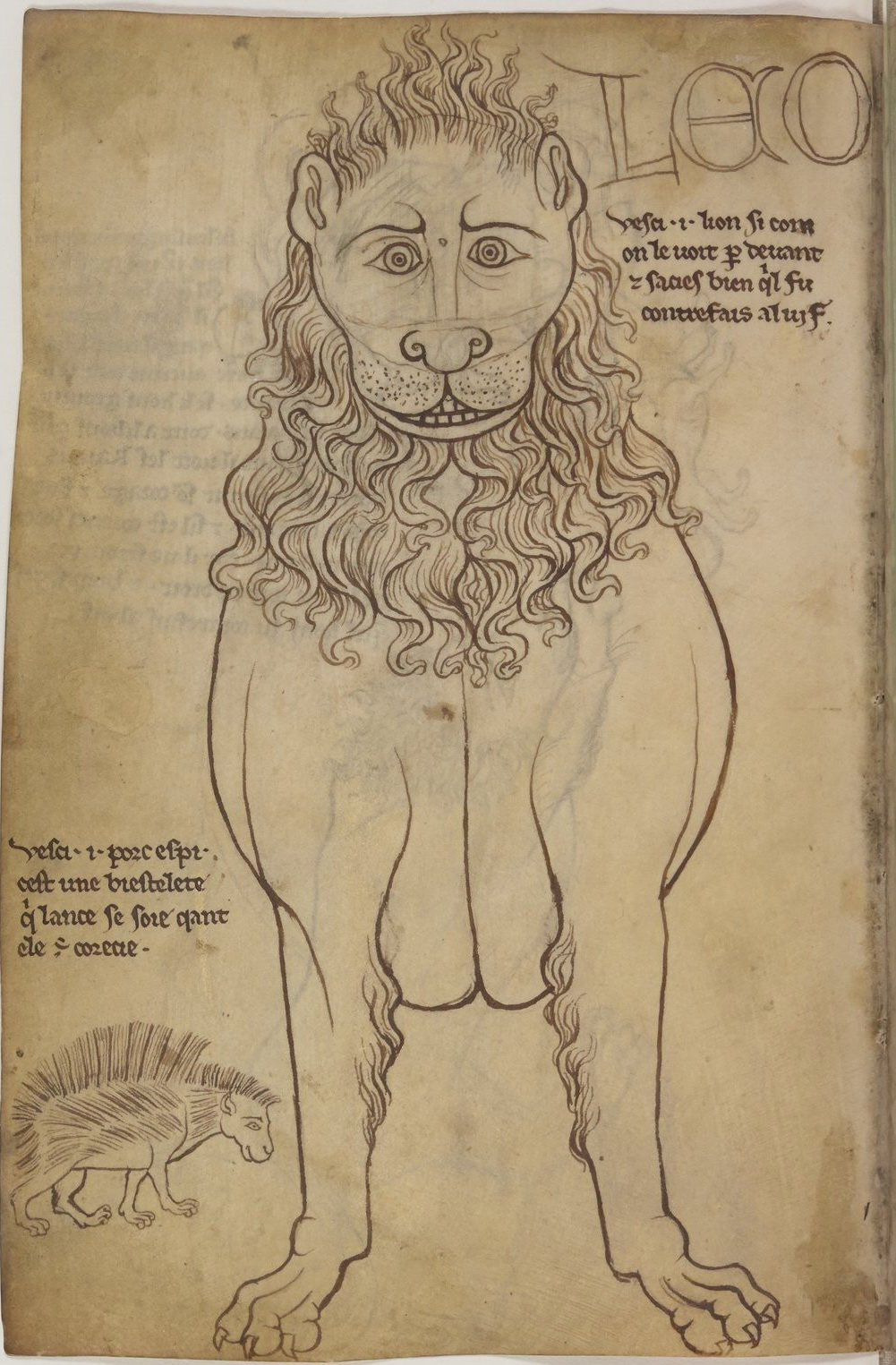
Lion and Pig Epic, France, 1230. Album by Villard de Honnecourt, Bibliothèque Nationale, Paris

=== Lion, king of the animals ===
In the Middle Ages, the lion's title as king of the beasts came from both the Bible and Greco-Roman heritage, as evidenced by scriptures, fables, encyclopedias, and bestiaries. The lion is usually identified by its tail and mane, and it is sometimes crowned as king. The lion is associated with medieval royalty through Richard I of England's nickname of Richard the Lionheart.

In the Old Testament, the lion is confronted by man on three occasions: killed with his bare hands by Samson, when a swarm of bees settles in his corpse; struck down by David to protect his father's sheep; and in the scene from Daniel in the lion's den.

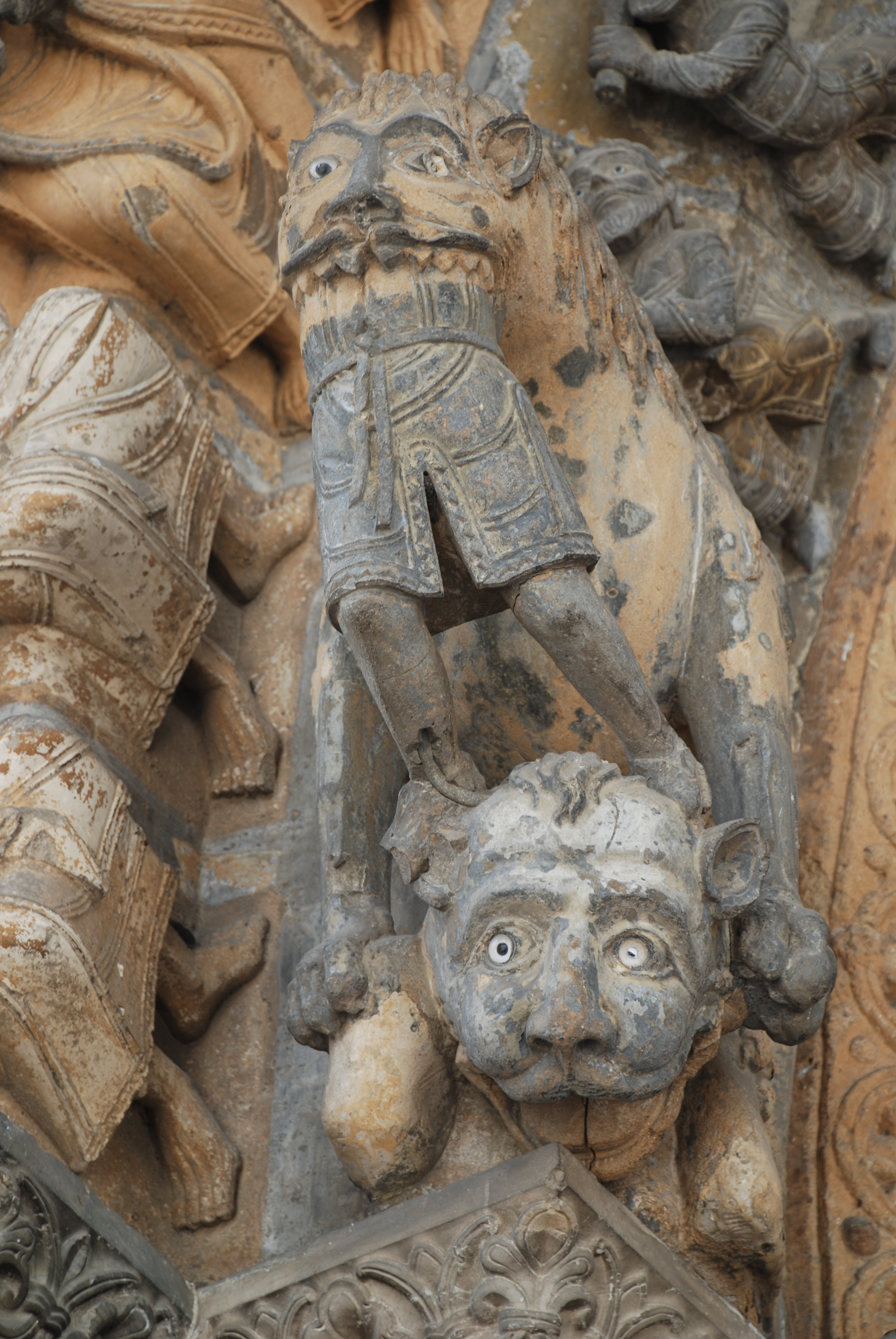
Lion devouring a sinner, Cathédrale Sainte-Marie d'Oloron, 12th century

Samson's fight against the lion is interpreted as Christ's victory over Satan. It is a scene often depicted in the Middle Ages, for example on church tympanums in bas-relief, carved on capitals, in illuminated manuscripts, or on the enameled altarpiece by Nicolas de Verdun created for Klosterneuburg Abbey. The scene of Samson gathering honey from the mouth of the dead lion appears on the Wiligelm-style carved doorframe of the Abbey of Nonantola, the lion thus becoming a Christ-like symbol.

The scene of David as a young shepherd features either a lion or a bear. The version with the lion appears, for example, on the Begon lantern in the treasury of the Abbey of Conques and is one of the fourteen full-page illustrations in the Psaultier de Paris, a 9th-century Byzantine manuscript. (Note: Folio 2v, French National Library, MS Grec 139)

Daniel in the lion's den, sometimes simply entitled "Daniel among the lions", is a frequently depicted scene. It appears on a 6th-century Visigoth capital in the church of San Pedro de la Nave, in numerous Romanesque churches, and on the portal of the church of Saint-Trophime in Arles.

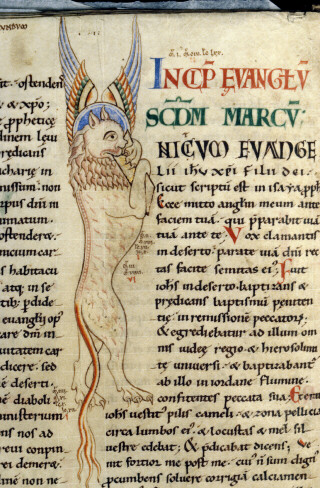
Lion of Saint Mark, Bible by Etienne Harding, 12th century, Dijon Municipal Library

The image of the lion can become more negative, as illustrated by Psalm 22, verse 22, "Save me from the lion's mouth", and we find sculptures of lions devouring men, as on the portal of the Cathedral of Sainte-Marie in Oloron. Another negative connotation is associated with a passage from Peter referring to Satan who roams like a lion seeking prey to devour. Psalm 91, verse 13, "You shall tread on the asp and the basilisk; you shall trample on the young lion and the dragon", is the origin of the figure of Christ treading on the beasts, as on the Genoelselderen diptych or the Christ blessing on the portal of Amiens Cathedral.

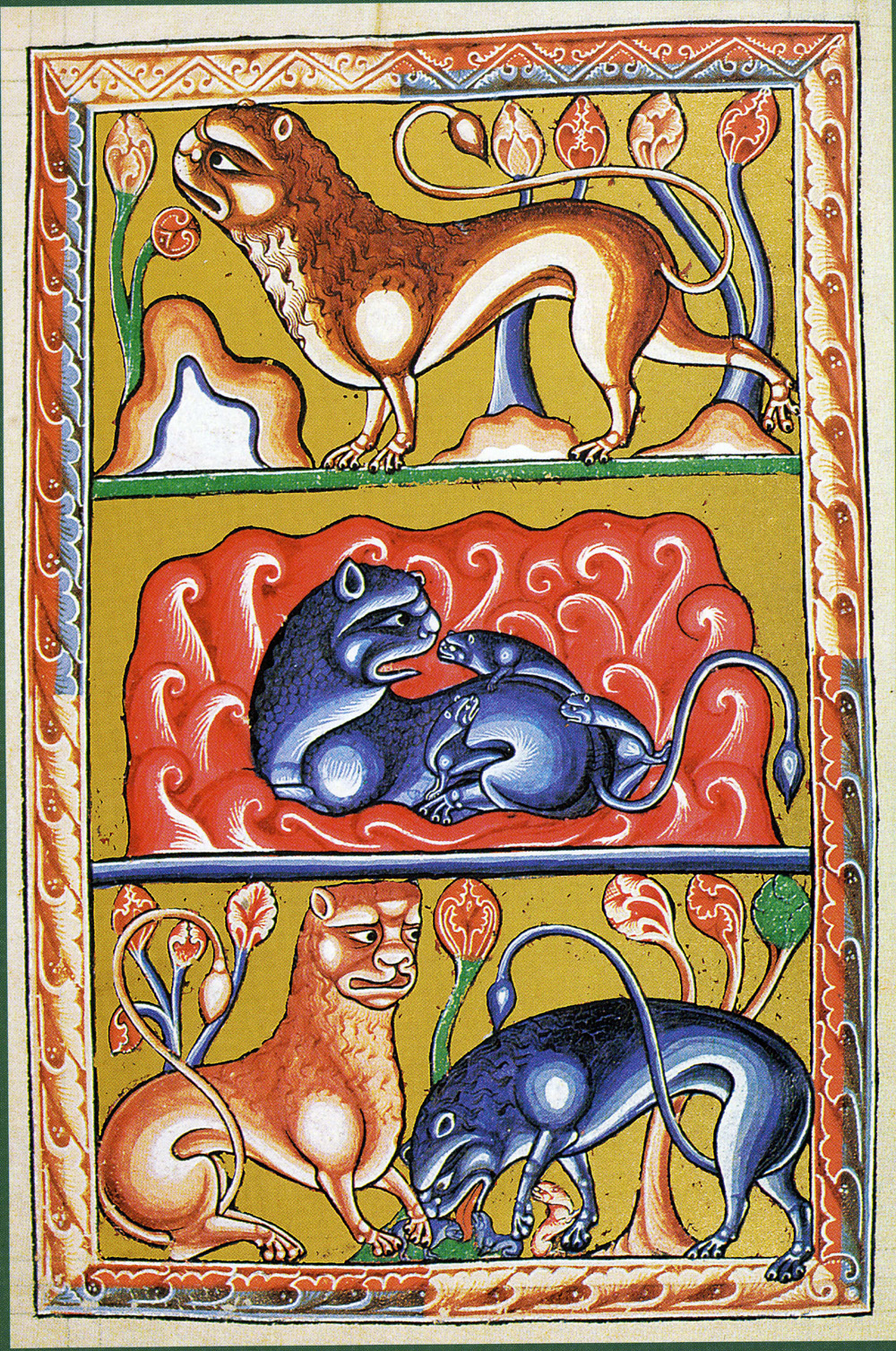
Illumination depicting a lion on high ground, the birth of cubs and their reanimation by the father. Ashmole Bestiary, 13th century, Oxford, Bodleian Library

In the Physiologos, and later in bestiaries, it is asserted that the lion can sleep with its eyes open, which gave the lion a guardian role, embodied by its presence at the entrance to churches and halls, as on the trumeau of the abbey of Saint-Pierre de Moissac. Illuminated manuscripts depict the lion according to the three fundamental characteristics given in the Physiologos: he stands at the top of the mountains, his eyes are open even when he sleeps, (Note: Here, the concept of a constantly vigilant guardian is presented.) and he brings his dead-born cubs back to life after they have spent three days in limbo. This last characteristic associates him with resurrection: he therefore is also interpreted as having a role in protecting men in death and is said to be found at the feet of those who lie dead.

The lion is also depicted through the positive images of Saint Jerome and his lion, and the tetramorph (Saint Mark's lion). The winged lion is highly represented in Venice: it is the city's symbol, and legend has it that the city is responsible for guarding the remains of Saint Mark. The lion is often seen in Catholic churches, representing the strength of the believer in the fight against sin, and objects such as lion's paw bracelets, episcopal seats carved with the effigy of a lion, candlestick bases, and church portals.

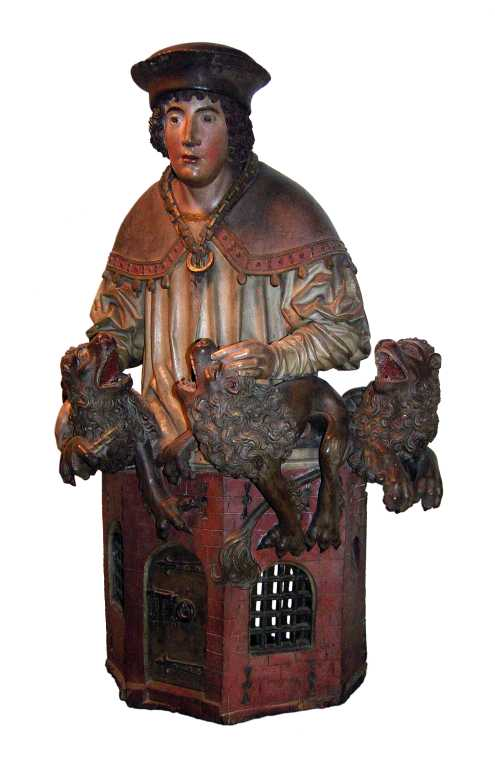
Daniel in the lion's den. Polychrome carved wood, Saint-Sauveur Cathedral, Bruges, 10th century.

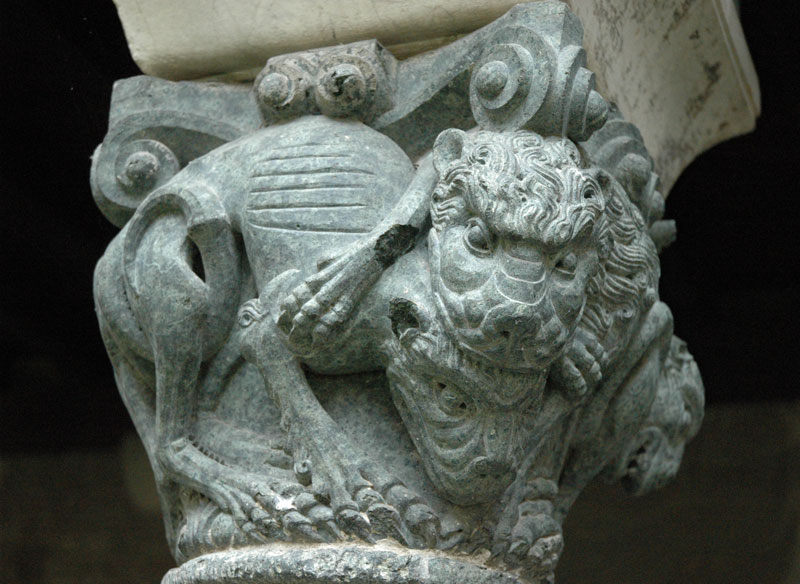
Sculpture by Maître de Cabestany in Prato Cathedral, Italy.

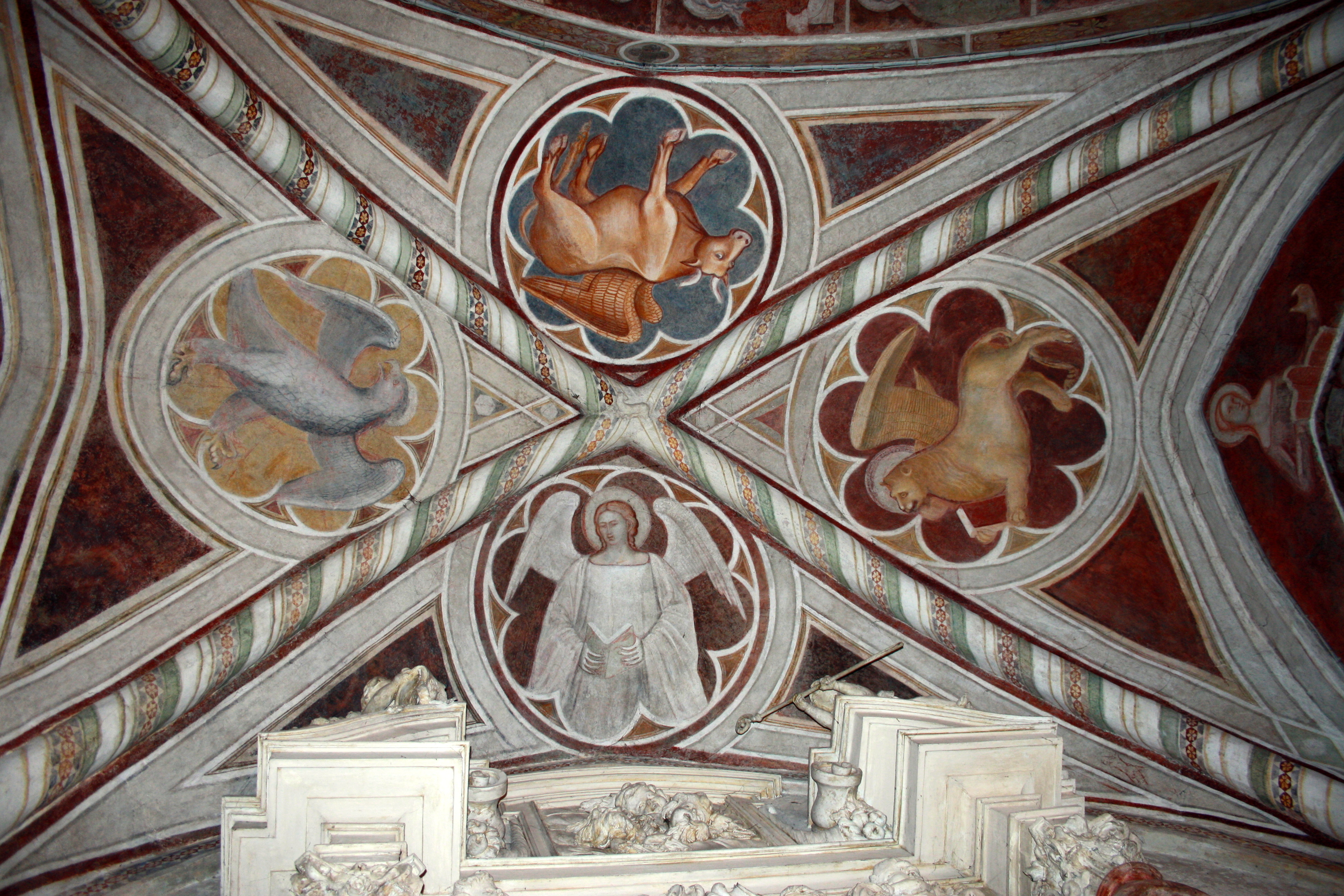
The four figures of the tetramorph. Gothic fresco in the Viboldone Abbey, Italy

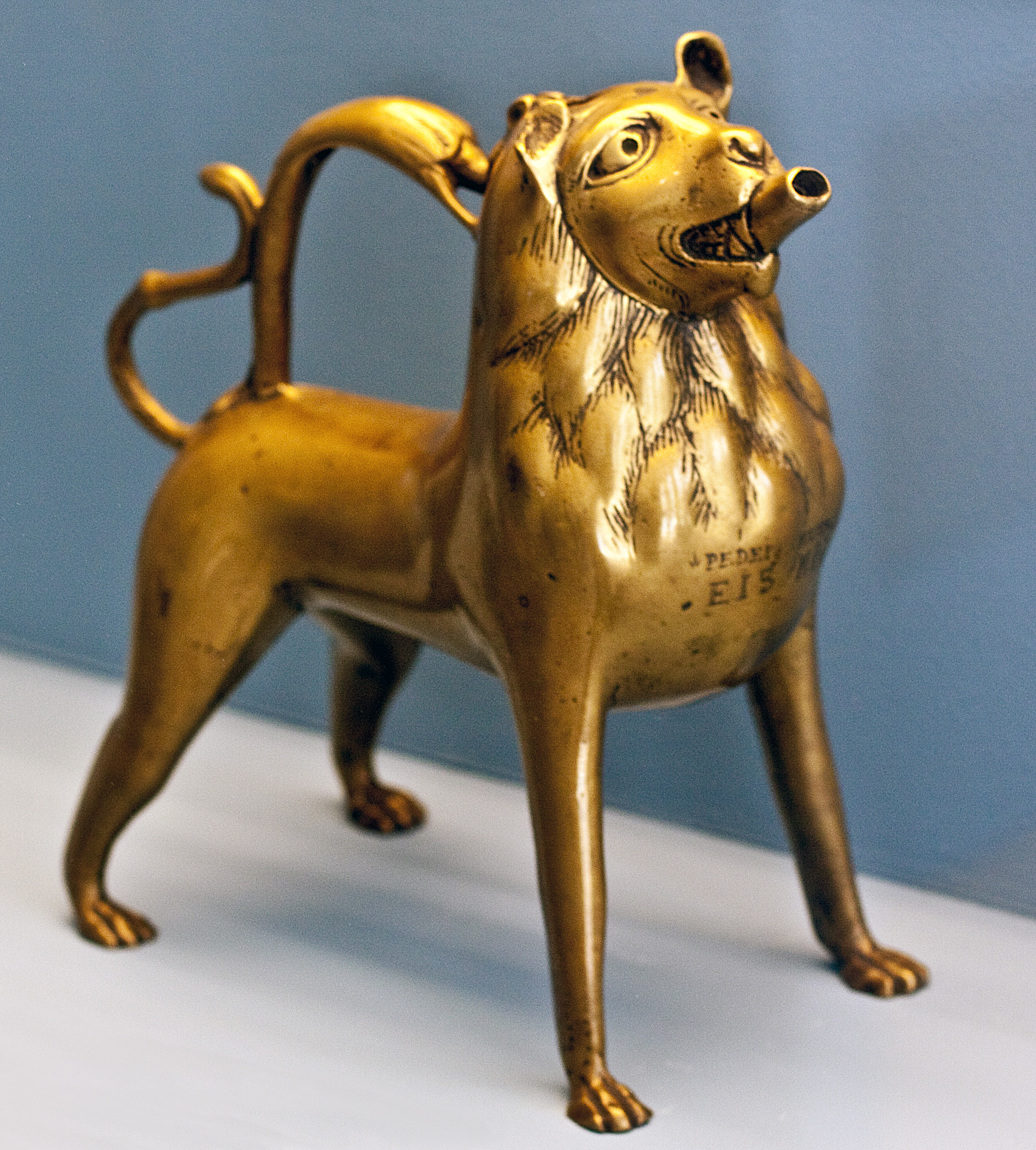
Lion-shaped aquamanile (1250–1300)

=== Bear, the fallen king ===
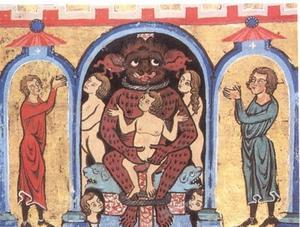
Representation of the Devil as a bear in a Bavarian lectionary, circa 1260–1270.

The bear was celebrated and venerated in Antiquity and the High Middle Ages, mostly by the Celts and Germanic-Scandinavians: Christian authorities therefore endeavored to combat these animistic cults by changing the symbolism of the bear, which went from being represented as king of the animals to becoming seen as a clumsy, silly, tame beast during the 12th century. This phenomenon took the form of physical combat against the animal and festivals dedicated to it, but also through hagiography and representations. Indeed, hagiography abounds with examples of saints taming bears, such as Saint Blaise, Saint Columban, and Saint Gall. All of them had the function of combating pagan bear cults. At the same time, according to Michel Pastoureau, many medieval theologians drew inspiration from Saint Augustine and Pliny the Elder to paint a portrait of the bear more related to the figure of the Devil. Thus associated with the Devil, the bear became his favorite animal or one of his forms. In Christian iconography, the Devil often has the feet, muzzle, and coat of a bear. The bear's hairy appearance and brown color became a sign of diabolical bestiality, and the animal was attributed capital sins.

=== Unicorn ===
==== Representations ====
The first unicorns in medieval bestiaries rarely resembled a white horse, but rather a goat, a sheep, a doe, a dog, a bear, or a snake. They came in a variety of colors, including blue, brown, and ochre, before the white color and twisted shape of the horn became widespread. Often confused with the rhinoceros, descriptions of the two began to merge as early as Pliny the Elder, who described the unicorn as existing in two varieties: one, very discreet, resembling an antelope or a goat with a single horn on the forehead, the other a huge, uncapturable animal with a very tough skin. The generalization of its caprine and equine form and white color is the result of the symbolism and allegories attributed to it.

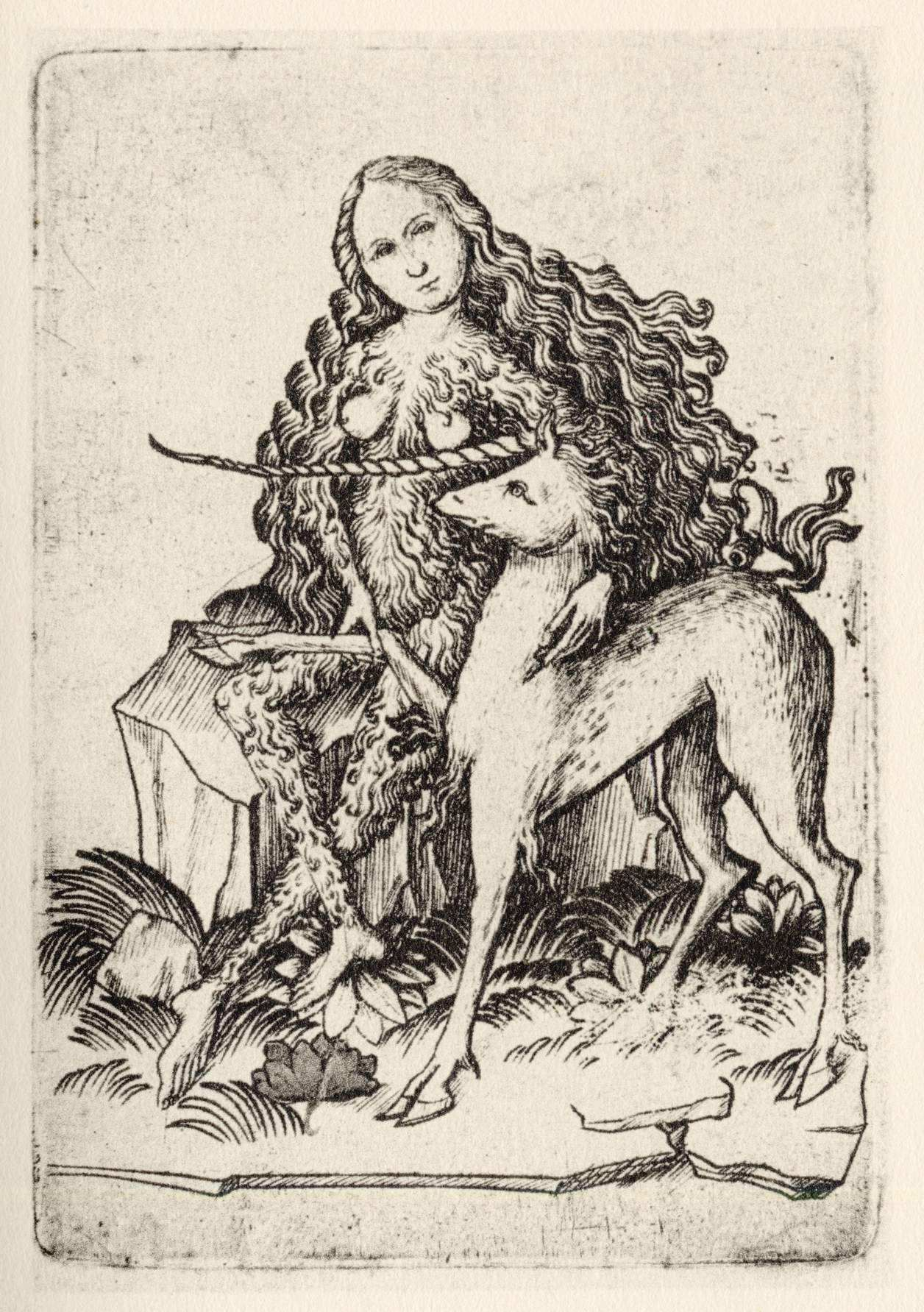
Wild young woman with an unicorn, c. 1460–1467

In the late 12th and early 13th centuries, the unicorn became a popular theme in bestiaries and tapestries in the Christian West, and to a lesser extent in sculptures. Two series of tapestries featuring unicorns can be mentioned here: The Unicorn Tapestries and The Lady and the Unicorn.

The Unicorn Tapestries is a famous series of seven tapestries executed between 1495 and 1505, depicting a group of noblemen pursuing and capturing a unicorn. This series, probably executed for a French patron (perhaps to mark a large wedding) by the Brussels or Liège workshops, subsequently came into the possession of the La Rochefoucauld family, before being purchased by John D. Rockefeller, who donated it to the Metropolitan Museum of Art, where it remains today.

The Lady and the Unicorn is a series of six tapestries dating from the late 15th century and exhibited at the Musée de Cluny in Paris. In each tapestry, a lion and a unicorn are depicted to the right and left of a lady. Five of these representations illustrate a sense, (Note: Taste: the lady takes a sugared almond from her servant; hearing: the lady plays the organ; sight: the unicorn contemplates herself in a mirror held by the lady; smell: while the lady is making a wreath of flowers, a monkey breathes in the scent of a flower he has seized; touch: the lady holds the unicorn's horn and a flagpole.) and the sixth tapestry, on which the phrase "Mon seul désir" (My only desire) can be read on a tent, is more debated by specialists.

==== Symbolism ====
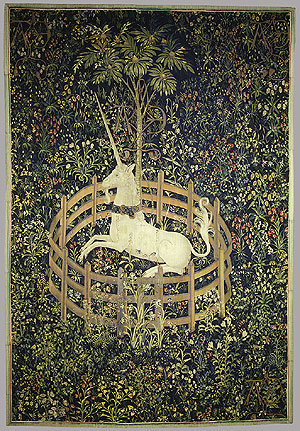
Unicorn in Captivity, tapestry from The Unicorn Tapestries series, Brussels workshops c. 1500, Cloisters Museum, Metropolitan Museum of Art

There are hundreds, if not thousands, of miniatures of unicorns with the same staging inspired by the Physiologos: the beast is seduced by a treacherous virgin and a hunter pierces its flank with a spear. The "capture of the unicorn" seems to stem from the culture of courtly love, linked to respect for women, leisure pursuits, music, and poetry, and all these illustrations are Christian-inspired, the unicorn representing betrayal of Christ, its flank pierced by a spear as in the biblical episode of the Passion of Jesus Christ. According to Francesca Yvonne Caroutch, the unicorn represents the divine beast whose horn captures cosmic energy and impregnates the Virgin Mary in the numerous "Annunciations to the Unicorn ".

According to the Dictionary of Symbols, works of art depicting two unicorns confronting each other represent a violent inner conflict between the unicorn's two values: virginity and fecundity. From the 15th century onwards, wild men and women became frequent in iconography and the unicorn was associated with wild beasts, sometimes ridden by Silvani, although only a virgin could ride it. This idea that the unicorn can only live apart from men, in a wild state and in a remote forest from which it cannot be torn, in which case it would die of sadness, was taken up by other authors much later, among which Carl Gustav Jung.

=== Dragon, king of serpents ===
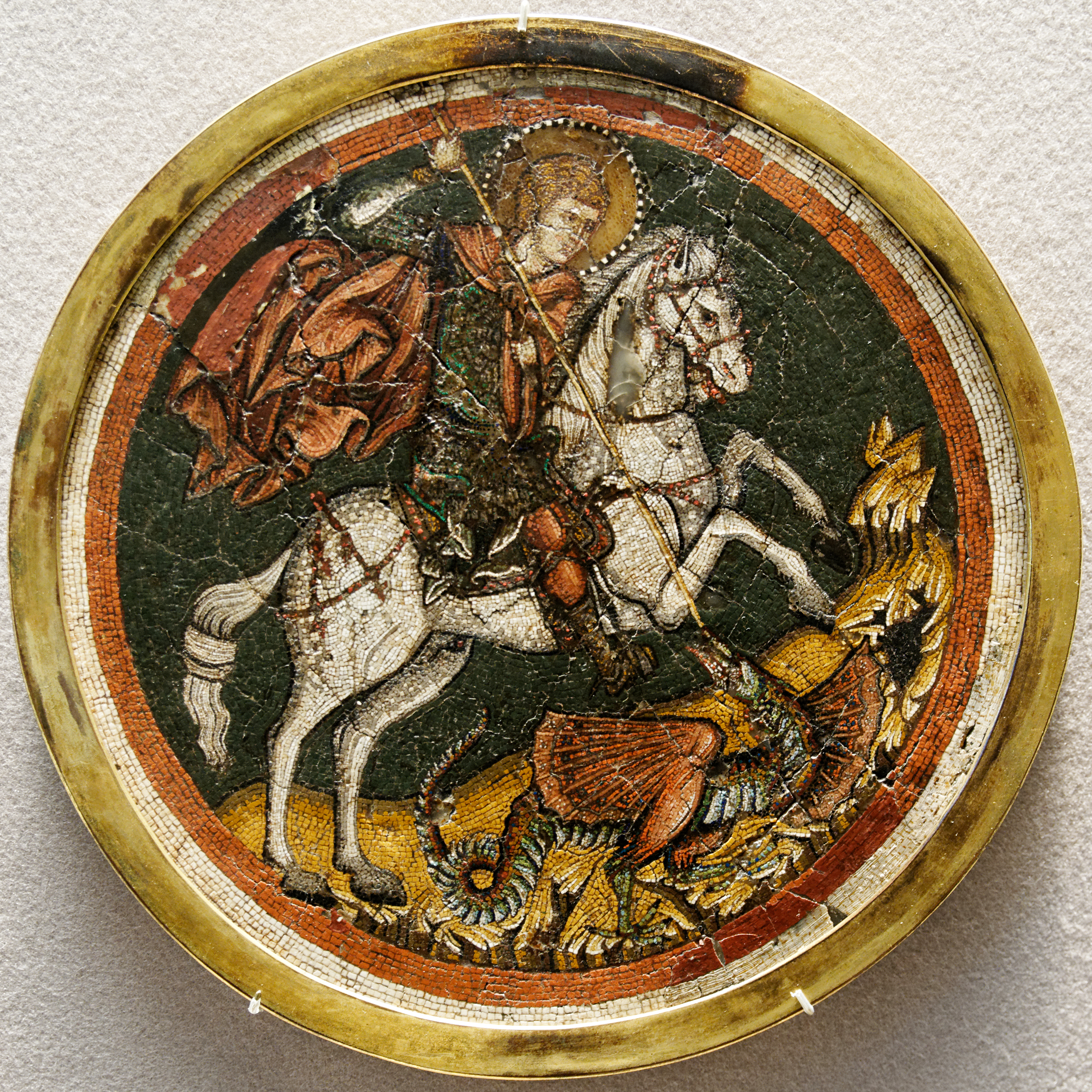
Saint George slaying the dragon, portable Byzantine mosaic, Louvre Museum, early 14th century

Issued from Celtic and Asian traditions, the dragon starts appearing in early Christian art. They can be found in Byzantine art, Slav icons, gargoyles, and illuminated manuscripts.

The medieval dragon is depicted as an evil, hideous monster always associated with evil. In Latin, draco means both dragon and serpent; the dragon is linked to the serpent and in particular to the tempter of Genesis, who drove Adam and Eve to taste the forbidden fruit. Medieval encyclopedias therefore classify it as a serpent.

The dragon is depicted in a variety of forms, most often with two clawed legs, a long reptilian tail, and sometimes wings, or even several heads.

In the Apocalypse, Saint Michael and his angels fight the dragon. It is brought down by many saints in battles that symbolize the triumph of Good over Evil, or even the victory of Christianity over paganism. In some versions of Saint George and the Dragon, for example, the saint agrees to kill the monster only if the villagers are baptized. In the legend of Saint Margaret of Antioch, the dragon that swallows the saint and from which she emerges intact thanks to a cross is the Devil. Martha of Bethany uses holy water to subdue a dragon, the tarasque, a six-legged dragon which, according to the golden legend, gives its name to the town of Tarascon.

=== Horse ===
Horses were part of everyday life in the Middle Ages. It was the attribute of knights and was the subject of a specific vocabulary: palfrey, destrier, or rouncey designate different types of horse for different uses. Fictional horses such as Pegasus have populated tales and legends since Antiquity. In the Middle Ages, chanson de geste heroes rode palfreys or fairy horses to serve courtly love.

== See also ==
- Lamb of God
- Peristerium
- Gargoyle
- Processional giants and dragons in Belgium and France
- Dragonslayer
- Reynard the Fox
- Jean de l'Ours
- Griffin

== Bibliography ==
=== Primary source ===
- de Clairvaux, Bernard (1866). "Apologia ad Guillelmum Sancti Theoderici abbatis" [Apology to Saint Abbot William Theodoricus]. Œuvres complètes de Saint Bernard [Complete works of Saint Bernard] (in French). Translated by Abbot Charpentier. Paris: Librairie Louis de Vivès. Archived from the original on 2016-03-03.

=== General books and publications ===
- Brion, Marcel (1955). "Les animaux, un grand thème de l'Art" [Animals, a major theme in art]. Horizons de France (in French). Paris.
- B. Clark, Willene (2006). A Medieval Book of Beasts : The Second-Family Bestiary. Commentary, Art, Text and Translation. Woodbridge: Boydell & Brewer Inc. ISBN 978-0-85115-682-8.
- B. Clark, Willene (1982). "The Illustrated Medieval Aviary and the Lay-Brotherhood". Gesta. 21 (1). International Center of Medieval Art: 63–74. doi:10.2307/766917. JSTOR 766917.
- Cordonnier, Rémy; Heck, Christian (2011). Le bestiaire médiéval [The Medieval bestiary] (in French). Paris: Citadelle & Mazenod. ISBN 978-2850885136.
- Heck, Christian; et al. (org.) (2008). "L'illustration du Bestiaire (XIe – XIIIe siècle): identité allégorique et allégorie identitaire" [Illustration of the Bestiary (11th–13th centuries): allegorical identity and allegory of identity]. L'allégorie dans l'art du Moyen Âge. Formes et fonctions. Héritages, créations, mutations [Allegory in medieval art. Forms and functions. Inheritances, creations, mutations] (in French). Turnhout: Brepols. pp. 157–170.
- Durliat, Marcel (1984). "Le monde animal et ses représentations iconographiques du XIe siècle au XVe siècle" [The animal world and its iconographic representations from the 11th to the 15th century]. Actes de la société des historiens médiévistes de l'enseignement supérieur public [Proceedings of the Society of Medieval Historians in Public Higher Education] (in French). Toulouse: Persee.
- Duchet-Suchaux, Gaston; Pastoureau, Michel (2002). Le bestiaire médiéval : dictionnaire historique et bibliographique [The medieval bestiary: a historical and bibliographical dictionary] (in French). Paris: Le Léopard d'or. ISBN 978-2-86377-176-1.
- Durand, Jannic (2009). L'art au Moyen Âge [Art in the Middle Ages] (in French). Paris: Larousse-Bordas. ISBN 978-2-03-584341-8.
- Faucon, Jean-Claude (1997). "La représentation de l'animal par Marco Polo" [Marco Polo's depiction of animals]. Voix et Signes. 16 (32): 97–117. doi:10.3406/medi.1997.1384.
- Hasig, Debra (1999). The mark of the Beast. New York: Routledge. ISBN 0-8153-2952-0.
- Marty-Dufaut, Josy (2005). Les animaux du Moyen âge : réels & mythiques [Animals of the Middle Ages: real & mythical] (in French). Gémenos: Autres temps. ISBN 2-84521-165-1.
- Lazaris, Stavros (2016). Le Physiologus grec [The Greek Physiologus] (in French). Vol. 1. Micrologus Library 77.
- Rebold Benton, Janetta (1992). The Medieval Menagerie: Animals in the Art of the Middle Ages. Abbeville. ISBN 978-1558591332.
- Tesnière, Marie-Hélène (2005). Bestiaire médiéval : Enluminures [Medieval Bestiary: Illuminations] (in French). Bibliothèque Nationale de France. ISBN 978-2-7177-2337-3.
- Thénard-Duvivier, Franck (2009). "Hybridation et métamorphoses au seuil des cathédrales" [Hybridization and metamorphosis on the threshold of cathedrals]. Images Re-vues. 6 (6). doi:10.4000/imagesrevues.686.
- Pastoureau, Michel (2011). Bestiaires du Moyen Âge [Bestiaries of the Middle Ages] (in French). Paris: éditions du Seuil. ISBN 978-2-02-102286-5.
- Delacampagne, Christian; Delacampagne, Ariane (2003). Animaux étranges et fabuleux : Un bestiaire fantastique dans l'art [Strange and fabulous animals: A fantastic bestiary in art] (in French). Citadelles & Mazenod. ISBN 978-2-85088-197-8.

=== Artistic movements ===
- Bialostocki, Jan (1993). L'Art du XVe siècle, des Parler à Dürer [Art of the 15th century, from Parler to Dürer] (in French). Paris: Pochothèque. pp. 372–377. ISBN 2-253-06542-0.
- Desmons, Gilles (1996). Mystère et beauté des abbayes cisterciennes [Mystery and beauty of Cistercian abbeys] (in French). Toulouse: Privat. ISBN 2-7089-9092-6.
- Horvat, Frank; Pastoureau, Michel (2001). Figures Romanes [Roman figures] (in French). Paris: Seuil. ISBN 978-2-02-093384-1.
- Caballero de del Sastre, Elisabeth; Rabaza, Beatriz; Valentini, Carlos; et al. (org.) (2006). Monstruos y maravillas en las literaturas latina y medieval y sus lecturas [Monsters and wonders in Latin and medieval literatures and their readings] (in Spanish). Rosario: Homo Sapiens Ediciones. ISBN 9789508085016.
- Roux, Jean-Paul (1980). "Mosquées anatoliennes à décor figuratif sculpté" [Anatolian mosques with carved figurative decoration]. Syria. Archéologie, Art et histoire (in French). 57 (1): 305–323. doi:10.3406/syria.1980.6689.
- Salin, Édouard (1942). "Sur quelques images tutélaires de la Gaule mérovingienne. Apports orientaux et survivances sumériennes" [On some tutelary images of Merovingian Gaul. Eastern contributions and Sumerian survivals]. Syria. Archéologie, Art et histoire (in French). 23 (3–4): 201–243. doi:10.3406/syria.1942.4284.

=== Lion ===
- Favreau, Robert (1991). "Le thème iconographique du lion dans les inscriptions médiévales" [The iconographic theme of the lion in medieval inscriptions]. Comptes-rendus des séances de l'année 1991 – Académie des inscriptions et belles-lettres, 135e année (in French). 135 (3): 613–636. doi:10.3406/crai.1991.15027.
- Denis-Huot, Christine; Denis-Huot, Michel (2002). L'Art d'être lion [The art of being a lion] (in French). Paris: Gründ. ISBN 2-7000-2458-3.

=== Bear ===
- Knappert, Laurentius (1894). La vie de saint Gall et le paganisme germanique [The life of Saint Gall and Germanic paganism] (in French). E. Leroux. ASIN B001C6YMVY.
- Pastoureau, Michel (2007). L'Ours : Histoire d'un roi déchu [The Bear: Story of a fallen king] (in French). Le Seuil. ISBN 978-2-02-021542-8.

=== Unicorn ===
- D'Astorg, Bertrand (1963). Le mythe de La Dame à la licorne [The myth of The Lady and the Unicorn] (in French). Paris: Éditions du Seuil.
- Faidutti, Bruno (1996). Images et connaissance de la licorne : Fin du Moyen Âge – XIXe siècle [Images and knowledge of the unicorn: Late Middle Ages – 19th century] (in French). Paris: Doctoral thesis, University of Paris XII (Literary and Human Sciences).
- Didrit, Mireille (1996). Note de recherche d'Ethnozoologie : Licorne de Mer ou Licorne de Terre : le Narval [Ethnozoology research note: Unicorn of the Sea or Unicorn of the Land: the Narwhal] (in French). University of Paris V Sorbonne, Master's degree in social and cultural anthropology.
- Caroutch, Francesca Yvonne (1997). Le mystère de la Licorne : à la recherche du sens perdu [The mystery of the Unicorn: in search of lost meaning] (in French). Dervy. ISBN 978-2-85076-845-3.
