= Bego (given name) =

Bego or Beggo (French: Bégon) is a masculine given name of Germanic origin, being a diminutive form of Berengar.

Bearers of the name include:

- Bego of Paris (died 816), count of Paris and Toulouse and margrave of Septimania
- Bego I (fl. 852), abbot of Conques
- Bego (bishop of Nîmes) (fl. 943–946), bishop of Nîmes
- Bego (fl. 962), bishop of Le Puy
- Bego (bishop of Clermont) (fl. 961–1010), abbot of Conques (as Bego II) and bishop of Clermont
- Bego III, abbot of Conques (r. 1087–1108)
- Bégon de Castelnau-Calmont (died 1388), bishop of Cahors
