= Begon =

The metallurgical site of Begon (or Begon II) is located in southern Chad, approximately 150 km from the regional center of Moundou.

== Site description ==
Covering an area of roughly 1800 sq m, the metallurgical site of Begon was used as a source of iron by the Sara people. The iron they extracted from the site between the 9th and 11th Centuries went into the production of tools, weapons, and currency for use by the Sara. 53 stoves were found during an inventory undertaken in 2003.

== World Heritage Status ==
This site was added to the UNESCO World Heritage Tentative List on July 21, 2005 in the Cultural category.
