= Paulines (Paul of Thebes) =

Group of Roman Catholic orders and congregations

Paulines, or Paulists, is the name used for Catholic orders and congregations under the patronage of Paul of Thebes the First Hermit. From the time that the abode and virtues of Paul of Thebes were revealed to Antony the Abbot, various communities of hermits adopted him as their patron saint.

== Male congregations ==
Congregations divided according to gender. Male and female congregations each have distinct characteristics.

=== Order of Saint Paul, the first hermit ===
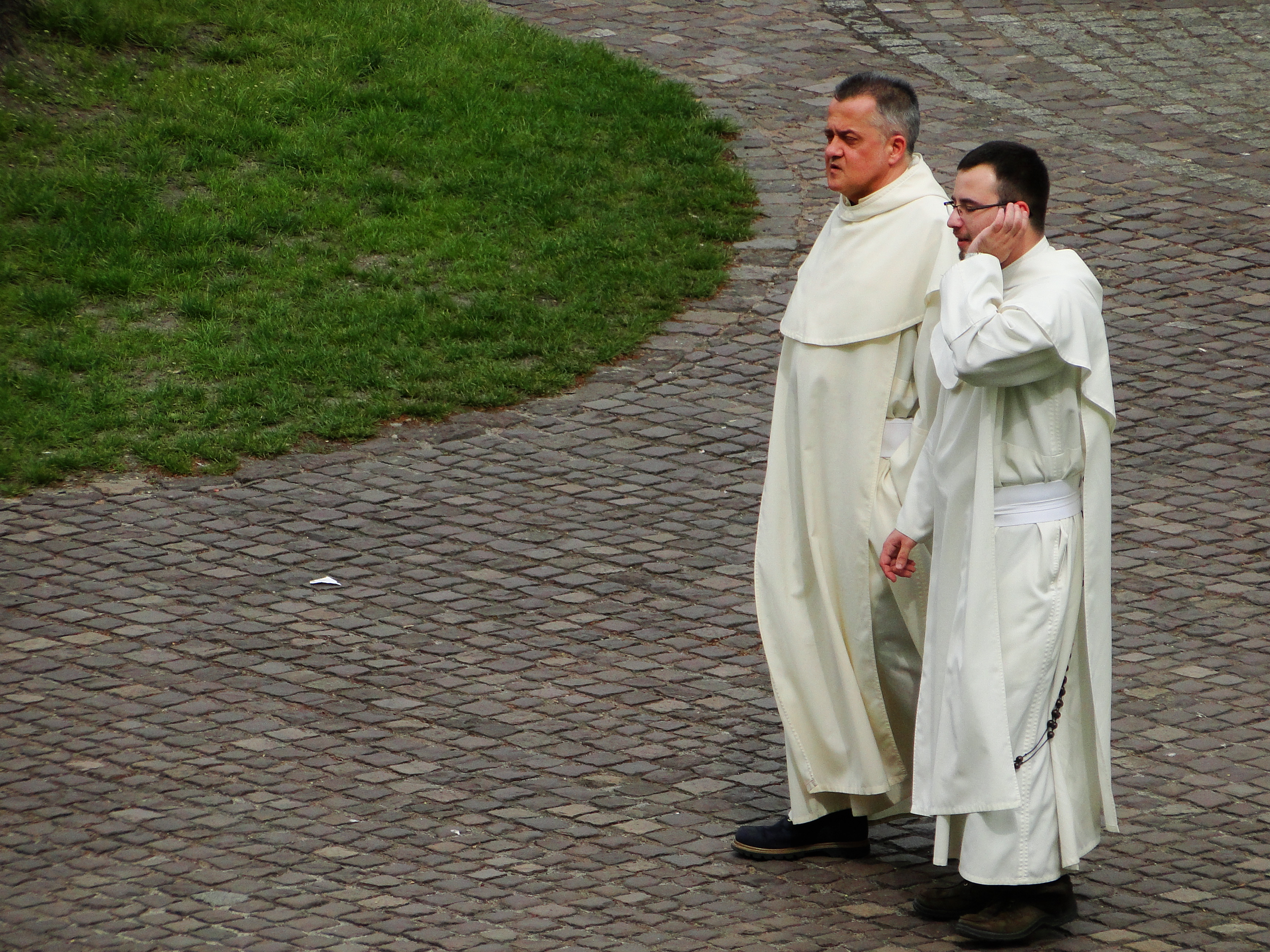
Pauline monks in Poland.

This monastic Order of Saint Paul the First Hermit was founded in 1215 in Hungary. The founder was Eusebius of Esztergom, who united the hermits of Hungary in monasteries under the patronage of Paul the Hermit.

The order spread throughout Hungary and then into Croatia, Germany, Poland, Austria and Bohemia. At one time, over 5000 Pauline monks lived in Hungary alone.

A significant event in the order's history took place in 1382 when it became the custodian of the miraculous picture of The Black Madonna, believed to be painted by Luke the Evangelist. Legend says the icon was brought to Poland by Prince Ladislaus from a castle at Beiz, Russia. He invited the monks to come from Hungary into Poland. The monks established a shrine for the image in the town of Częstochowa. Today this shrine is the motherhouse of the order, and is also the largest monastery, with over 100 monks. About 500 members of the order remain.

Most of the order's monasteries are located in Poland. Other monasteries and shrines survive in Germany, Slovakia, Croatia, Ukraine, Belarus, Hungary, Italy, United States of America and South Africa.

=== Hermits of Saint Paul of France ===
They are also called Brothers of Death. Controversy swirls around the origin of this congregation, but it was probably founded about 1620 by Guillaume Callier, whose constitutions for it were approved by Pope Paul V (18 December 1620) and later by King Louis XIII (May, 1621).

The two classes of monasteries were those in the cities, obliged to maintain at least twelve members, who visited the poor, the sick, and prisoners, attended those condemned to death, and buried the dead; and those outside the city, which were separate cells in which solitaries lived. The community assembled weekly for choir and monthly to confess their sins. Severe fasts and disciplines were prescribed. The name Brothers of Death originated from the fact that the thought of death was constantly before the followers. At their profession the prayers for the dead were recited; their scapular bore the skull; their salutation was Memento mori 'remember you're to die'; the death's head was set before them at table and in their cells. This congregation was suppressed by Urban VIII in 1633.

=== Hermits of Saint Paul of Portugal ===
Among the conflicting accounts of the foundation of this congregation, the most credible is that it was established about 1420 by Mendo Gomez, a nobleman of Simbria, who resigned military laurels to retire in solitude near Setúbal, where he built an oratory and gave himself up to prayer and penance, gradually assuming the leadership of other nearby hermits.

Later, a community of hermits of the Sierra de Ossa, left without a superior, prevailed on Mendo Gomez to unite the two communities under the patronage of Paul of Thebes, the first recognized hermit.

At the chapter held after the death of the founder (24 January 1481), constitutions were drawn up, later approved, with alterations, by Gregory XIII in 1578, at the request of Cardinal Henry of Portugal, who obtained the privilege of adopting the Rule of St. Augustine.

This congregation was later suppressed. Probably the most celebrated member was Antonius a Matre Dei, author of Apis Libani, a commentary on the Proverbs of Solomon.

== Female congregations ==
=== Blind Sisters of Saint Paul ===
The Blind Sisters were founded in Paris in 1852, by Abel-François Villemain (d. 1870), Anne Bergunion (d. 1863), and Jugé. Its mission is to enable blind women to lead a religious life, and to facilitate the training of blind children in useful occupations. A home was established for blind women and girls with defective sight.

=== Sisters of Saint Paul of Chartres ===
The Sisters were formerly known as "Daughters of the School." In 1696, the congregation was founded by Louis Chauvet, parish priest of Levesville-la-Chenard, a village in the region of Beauce, some 60 miles southeast of Paris.

Marie Anne de Tilly, a member of the first community of three Sisters, prepared her companions for their mission: to instruct the daughters of farm laborers, to teach poor village girls, to visit the poor and the sick and to serve in the hospitals in small communities of two or three sisters. As early as 1708, Chauvet entrusted the growing community of the School Sisters to Paul Godet des Marais, Bishop of Chartres. Godet provided a house in the St. Maurice suburbs, an ecclesiastical superior in the person of Marechaux, and a name, that of the Apostle Paul who was to be their patron and model. From the time of its birth, one foundation followed another in rapid succession. One of their houses in Chartres formerly belonged to a sabot-maker, and this gave them the name of "Les Soeurs Sabotiers", by which they were originally known.

There were no lay-sisters. Every sister must be prepared to undertake any kind of work. The postulancy lasts from six to nine months, the novitiate two years, after which the sisters take vows annually for five years, and then perpetual vows.

The congregation was dispersed under the Commune at the French Revolution, but it was restored by Napoleon I. He gave the sisters a monastery at Chartres, which originally belonged to the Jacobins, from which they became known as "Les Soeurs de St. Jacques".

After its revival the congregation numbered 1200 sisters and over 100 houses in England, Guadeloupe, Martinique, French Guiana, Korea, China, Japan, Further India, the Philippines, etc. In China, a novitiate was established for native subjects; and in Hong Kong, a school for European children, along with various benevolent institutions. In the Philippines, schools, hospitals, pastoral centers including and a leper hospital, and a formation house for candidates wishing to belong to the Congregation.

They settled in England in 1847 at the invitation of Nicholas Wiseman. In 1907, they had fifty-six houses in various towns; their work in England was mainly educational, schools were attached to all their houses. Until 1902, they had over two hundred and fifty houses in France where, besides schools, they undertook asylums for the blind, the aged, and the insane, hospitals, dispensaries and crèches. More than one hundred and sixty of these schools were later closed because of the laicist policy of the Waldeck-Rousseau government and succeeding governments in France, as were thirty of the hospitals, military and civil, in the French colonies, three convents at Blois and a hospice at Brie. They opened five or six hospitals in the French colonies, six hospitals and 39 schools in the Philippines, and three educational houses and Saint Louis Hospital in Thailand.

Guided by the motto of the congregation, Caritas Christi Urget Nos (The Charity of Christ Urges Us), at present, some 4000 Sisters of Saint Paul of Chartres work in 34 countries.
