= Solène =

French given name

Solène is a French given name, predominantly feminine in modern usage, but historically also used for males:

- Solène (bishop), bishop of Chartres and saint
- Solène of Aquitaine, 3rd century Christian martyred at Chartres, France
- Solène Rigot
- Solène Ndama
- Solène Durand, French football goalkeeper
- Solène Jambaqué
- Solène Coulot (1989-2010)
