= Saint Thomas Becket window in Sens Cathedral =

Stained-glass window in Sens Cathedral

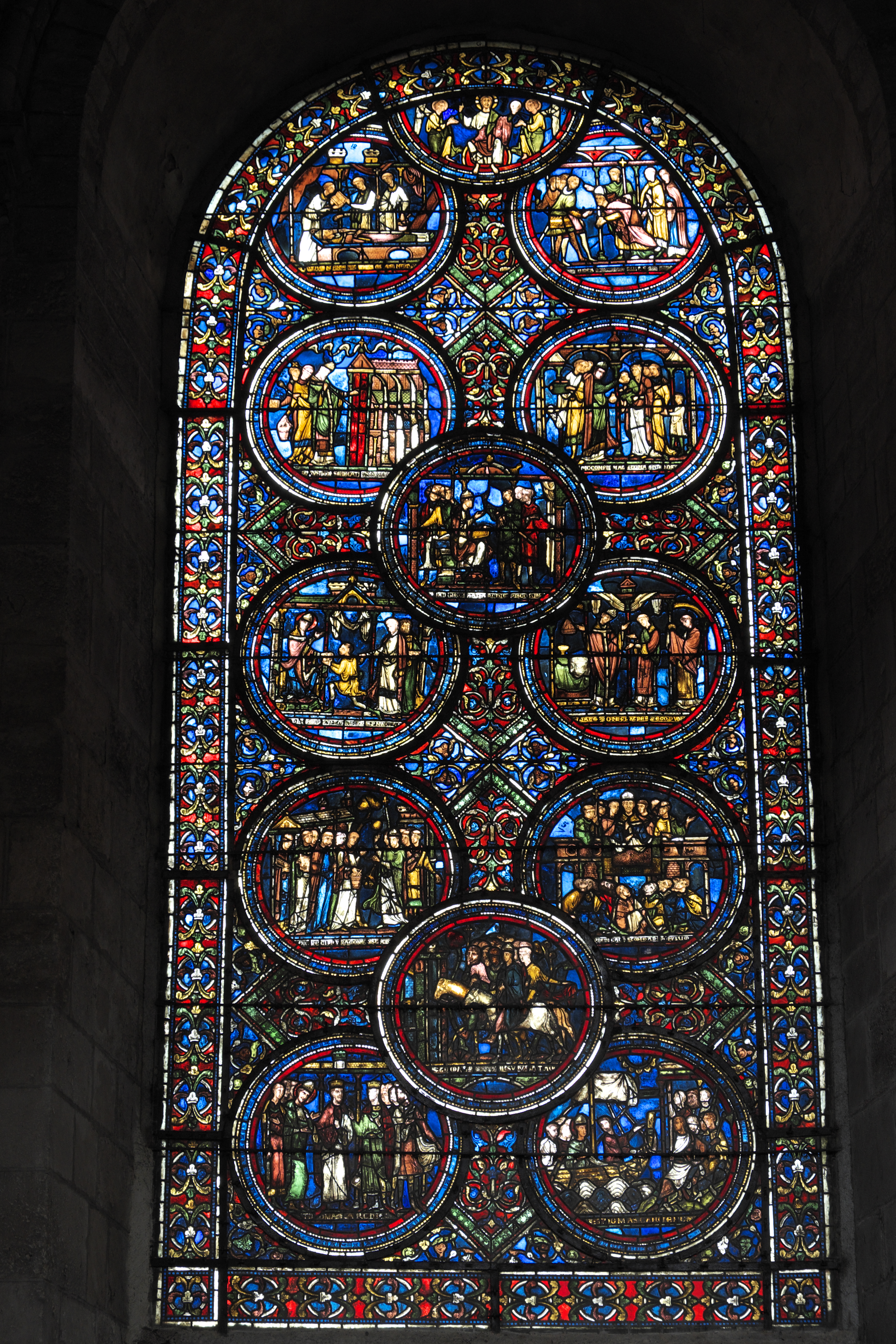
Overall view

The Saint Thomas Becket window in Sens Cathedral is an early 13th century stained glass window in Sens Cathedral. Noted as a monument historique, it is five metres high by two metres wide. Its designer's name is unknown. Thomas Becket visited Sens twice during his exile from England - once in 1164 to meet Pope Alexander III and once in 1170 just before returning to England.

== Location ==
The window was granted the bay number 23 in the Corpus vitrearum medii aevi. It is located in the north choir aisle and is made up of thirteen medallions, four at the top, four at the bottom and five forming a cross in the centre, reading bottom to top. It shows scenes from Thomas' life and is one of a dozen such windows in north-west France - another is at Chartres. At top centre is Christ blessing.

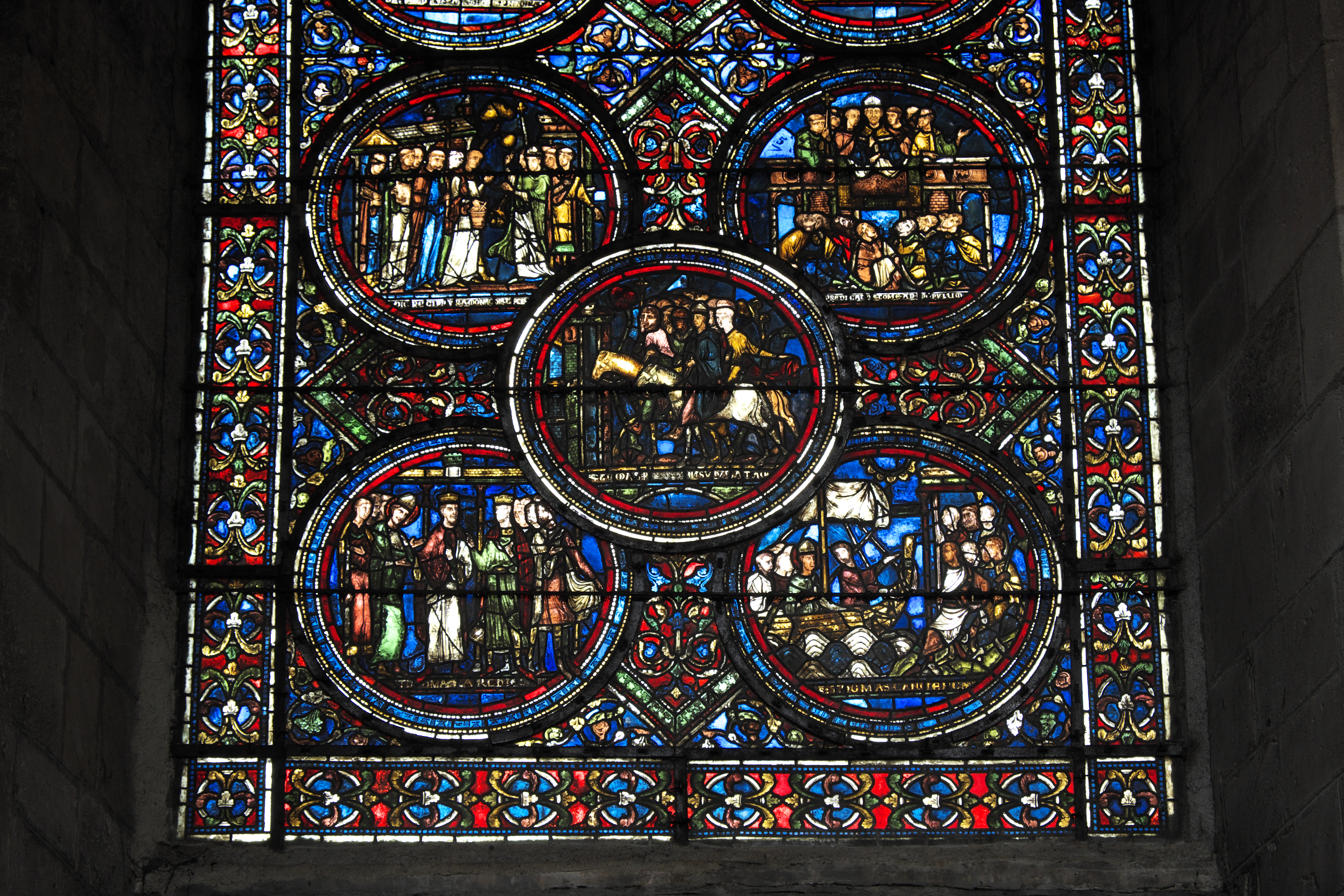
Lower scenes.

== Attempted reconciliation between Becket and Henry II of England ==
At bottom left is Thomas attempting a reconciliation with Henry II of England, whilst at bottom right Thomas returns to England by ship. In the middle Thomas rides up to the gates of Canterbury and immediately above it to the left he is welcomed to Canterbury Cathedral by its chapter of canons. He then preaches before the people

== Messenger from Henry II ==
The five central medallions show Thomas receiving a messenger from Henry (bottom left) and celebrating mass in his cathedral (bottom right).

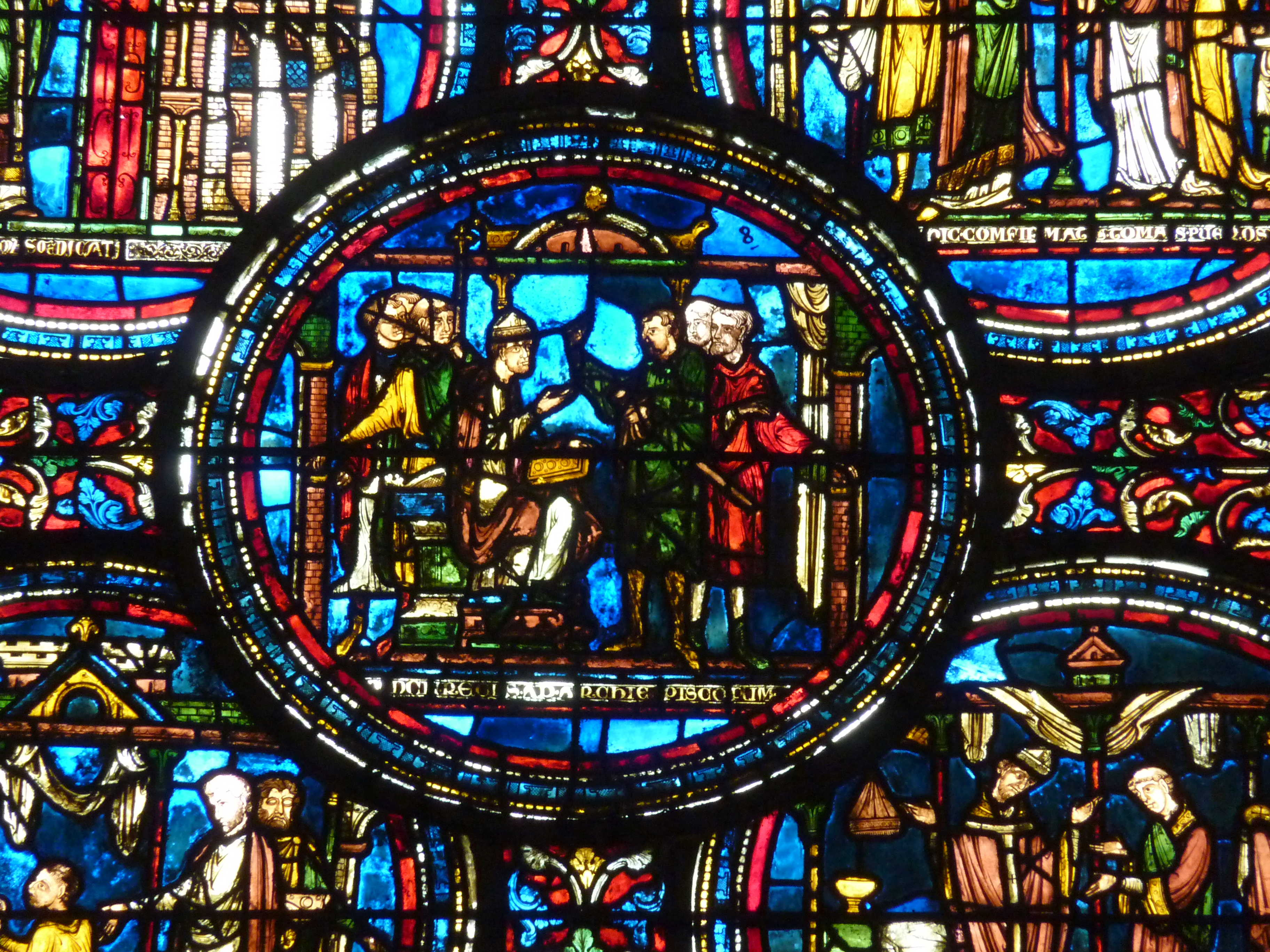
The king's envoys meet Thomas Becket

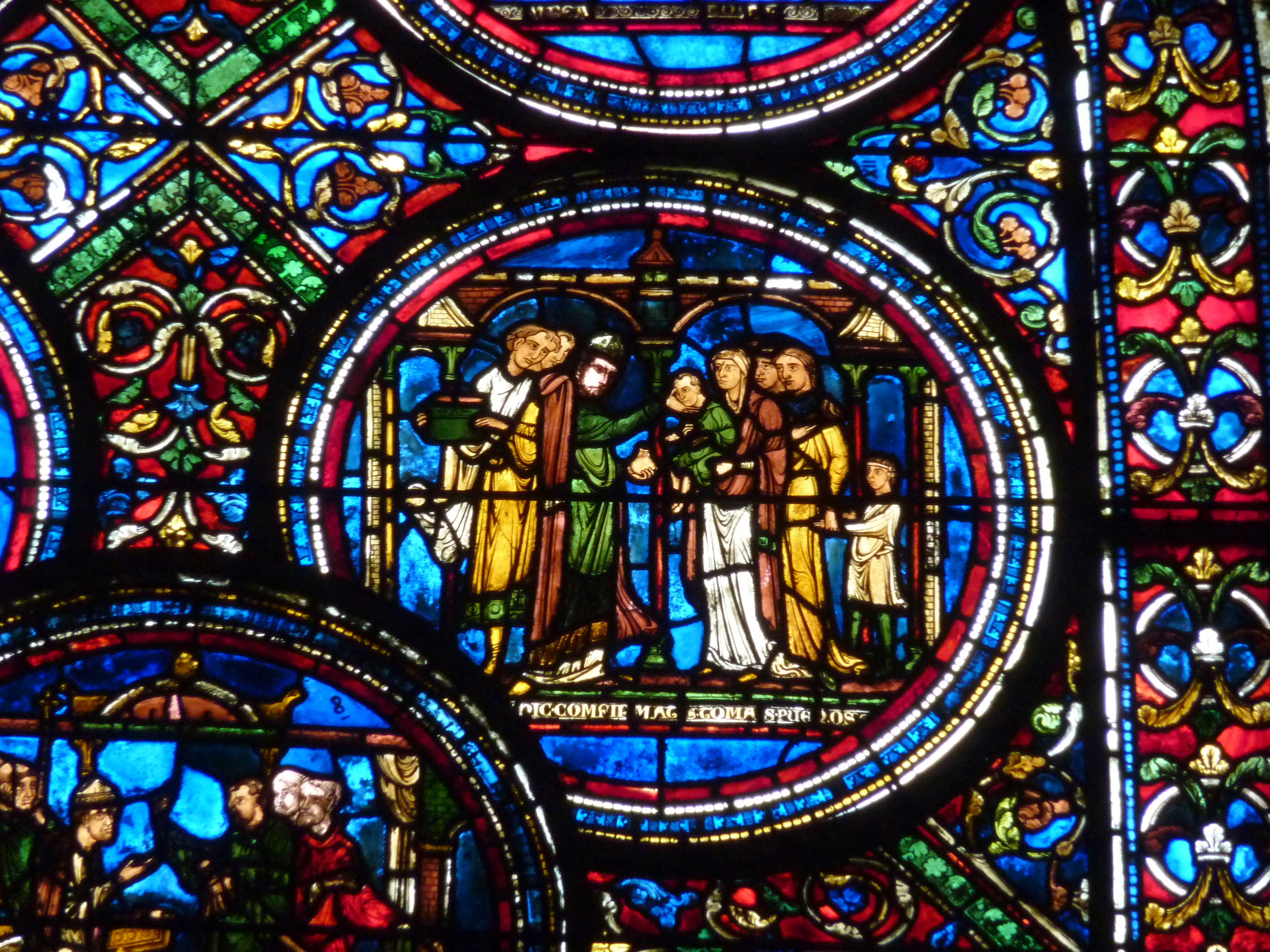
Thomas Becket baptises a child

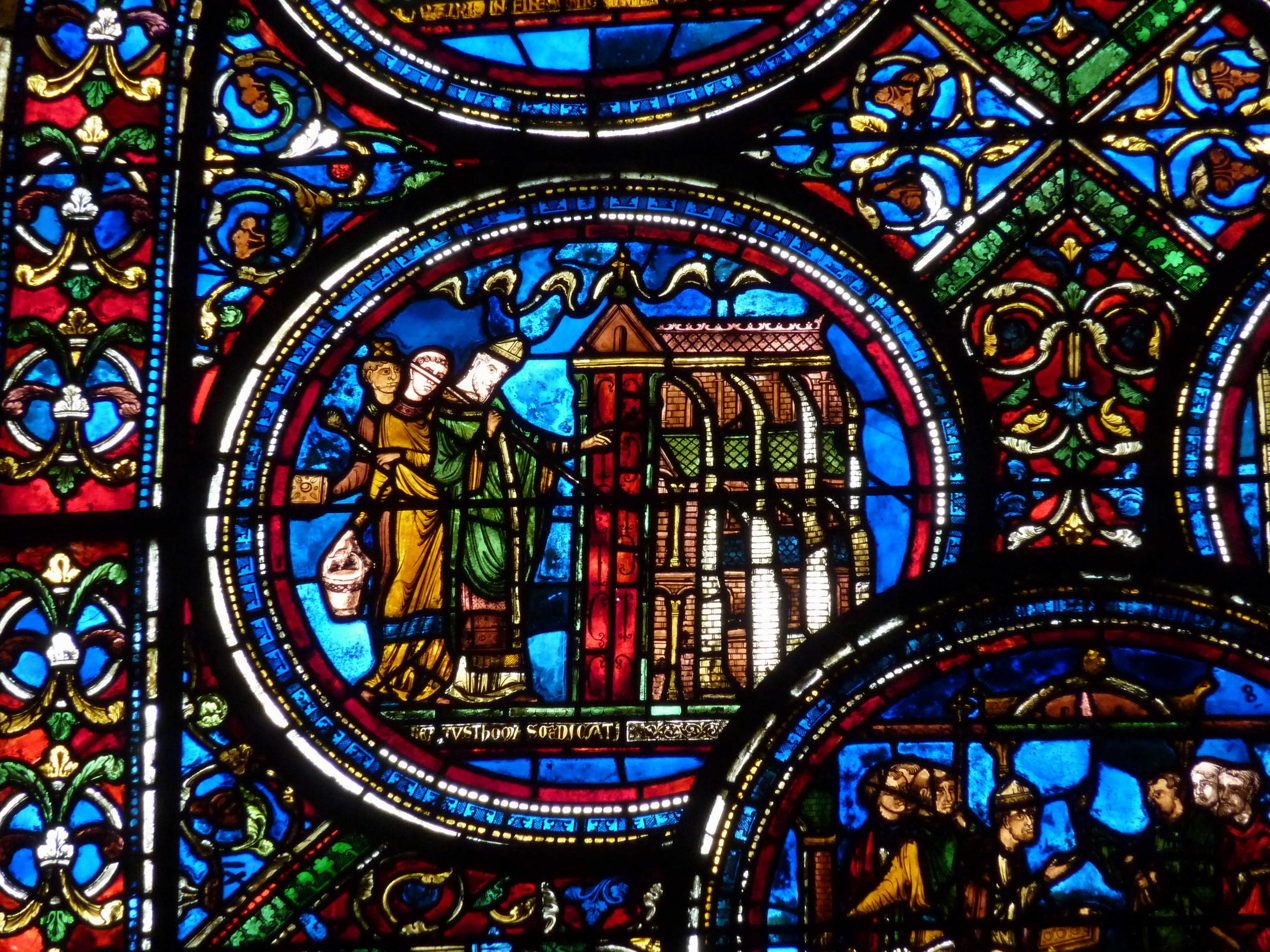
Thomas Becket consecrates a church

Murder and Burial:

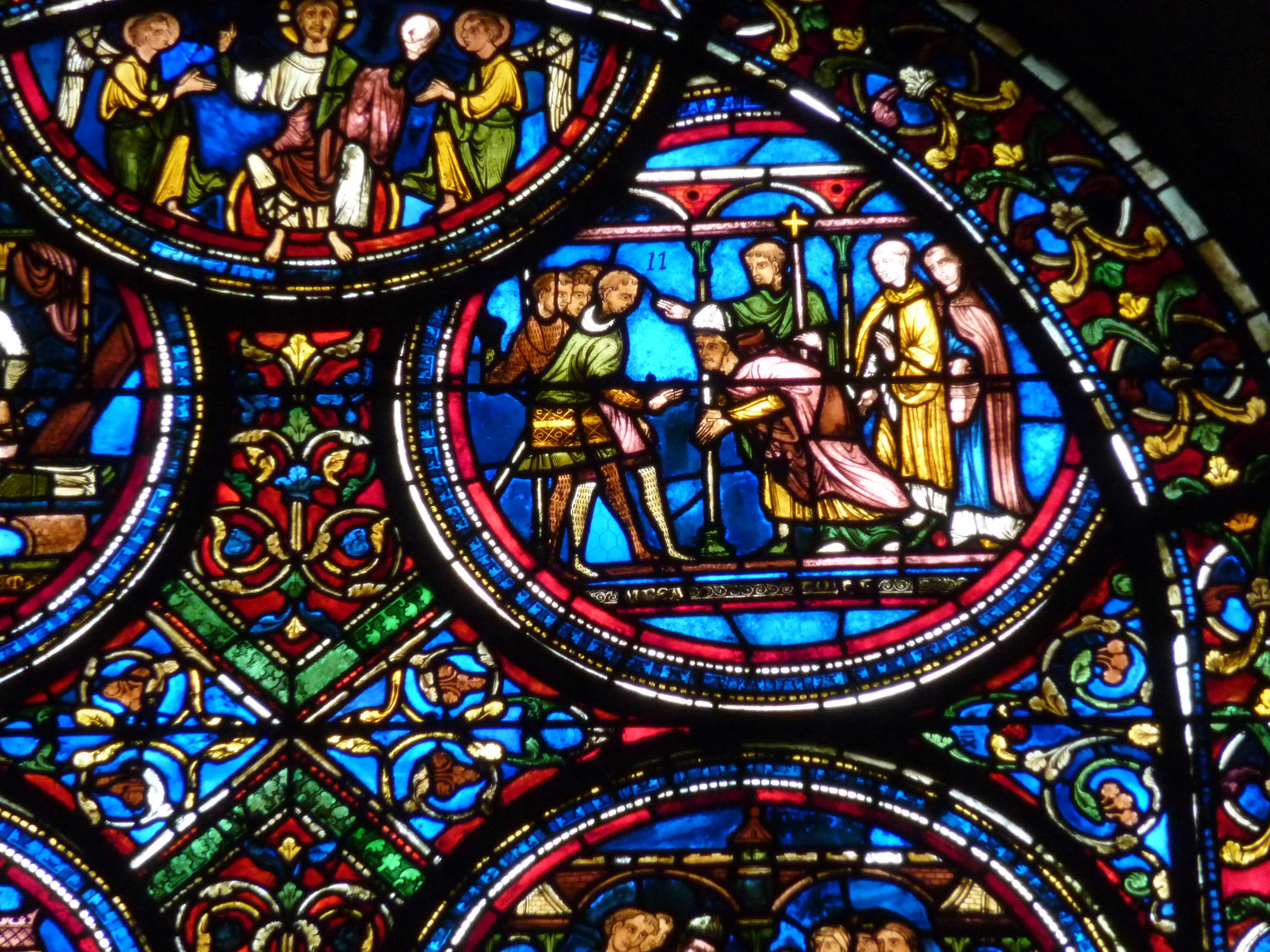
Medallion 11 (top right) : Thomas murdered

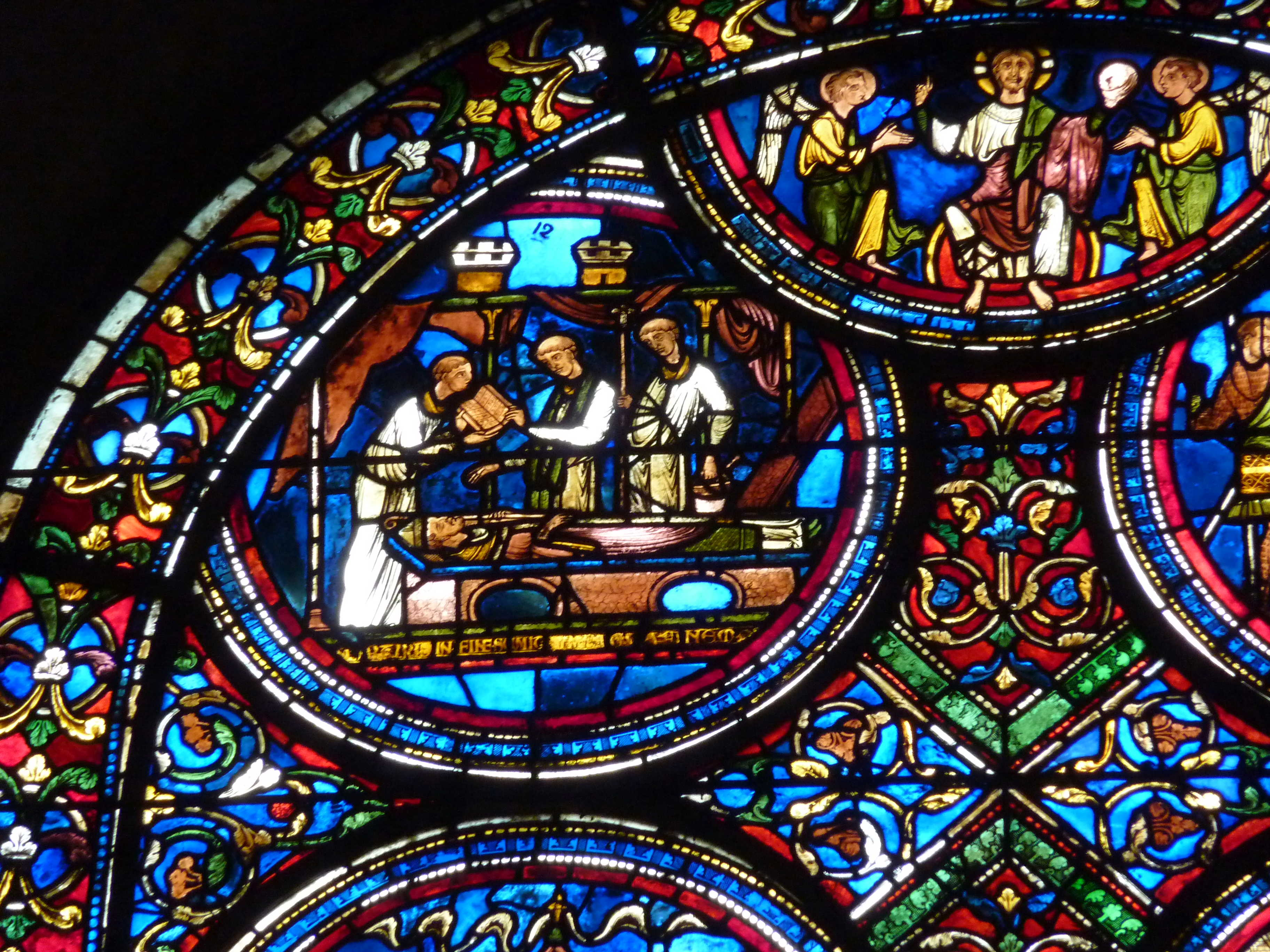
Medallion 12 (top left) : Thomas' body laid in a tomb

== Bibliography ==
- (in French) Bernard Brousse, Claire Pernuit et Françoise Perrot : Les Vitraux de la cathédrale de Sens. Merveilles du XIIIe aux XIXe siecles. Éditions À PROPOS, Garches, 2013. pp. 46–53, ISBN 9782915398120
