= Paul Godet des Marais =

French bishop

- Bishop of Chartres
- Church: Catholic Church
- Diocese: Diocese of Chartres
- In office: 4 February 1692 – 26 September 1709
- Predecessor: Ferdinand de Neufville de Villeroy
- Successor: Charles-François des Montiers de Mérinville

Orders
- Consecration: 31 August 1692 by François de Harlay de Champvallon

Personal details
- Born: 1647 Talcy en Beauce, Duchy of Orléanais, Kingdom of France
- Died: 26 September 1709 (aged 61–62) Chartres, Duchy of Orléanais, Kingdom of France

Paul Godet des Marais (1647–1709) was a French Bishop of Chartres, and served as spiritual director for Mme de Maintenon.

== History ==
Marais was born at Talcy, near Blois. He studied at Saint-Sulpice, took the doctorate of theology at the Sorbonne, was ordained, and became (1677) superior of the Séminaire des Trente-Trois. He preached missions in various parts of France. In 1690 Louis XIV nominated him to the see of Chartres, but owing to difficulties between France and the Holy see the papal confirmation came only on 21 January 1692. On his promotion to the episcopacy he gave all his revenue to the poor.

Godet des Marais was spiritual director of Mme de Maintenon, for whom he wrote Lettres de direction. She had established the Maison royale de Saint-Louis, a boarding school at Saint-Cyr, for the daughters of nobles killed in the king's wars who had no dowry. The Congregation of the Mission became responsible for attending to the spiritual needs of Saint-Cyr under a contract drawn by Godet, in whose diocese it lay. He became chaplain at Saint-Cyr, which was in his diocese. The agreement also provided that the Vincentians conduct missions on lands belonging to the Abbey of Saint-Denis.

Godet was an ardent defender of orthodox doctrine, especially against Quietism and other exaggerated approaches to spirituality that were current at the time. He used his influence to have Mme Guyon removed from Saint-Cyr. He signed with Cardinal Louis-Antoine de Noailles and Bossuet the Declaratio condemning Fénelon's Maximes des saints (1697).

He then wrote (1698) several ordonnances, or pastoral letters, against the mysticism of Molinos, Fénelon, and Mme Guyon. He also did much to destroy Jansenism in France, refuted the cas de conscience (1703), commanded obedience to the papal constitution of Pope Clement XI (1705), and severely censured Gaspard Juénin's Institutions théologiques (1708).

A classmate of Jean-Baptiste de La Salle at the Seminary of Saint-Sulpice, in 1699 he invited de La Salle to establish schools in his diocese. He supported the Brothers as long as he lived, doing whatever he could to make their life more bearable and their work more productive and appreciated. In 1708 the small community of sisters, founded by Father Louis Chauvet, was entrusted to him. The bishop gave them a small house and the name Sisters of Saint Paul of Chartres with the Apostle Paul as patron.

His zeal and charity as well as his orthodoxy, were set forth in an epitaph written by his successor, Charles-François des Montiers de Mérinville. He died at Chartres.
