= Saint Thomas Becket window in Chartres Cathedral =

Stained glass window

Whole window.

Saint Thomas Becket window in Chartres Cathedral is a 1215–1225 stained-glass window in Chartres Cathedral, located behind a grille in the Confessors' Chapel, second chapel of the south ambulatory. 8.9 m high by 2.18 m wide, it was funded by the tanners' guild. The furthest left of five lancet windows in the chapel, it is difficult to view and is heavily corroded by glass oxidisation, which has made its left side especially hard to read.

It is contemporary with the current cathedral, built after an 1194 fire. It was classed as a monument historique in the first listing in 1840. The window was restored by Gaudin in 1921 and by Lorin's workshop in 1996. It is split vertically into eleven equal registers by ten horizontal leadwork pieces.

== Motifs ==
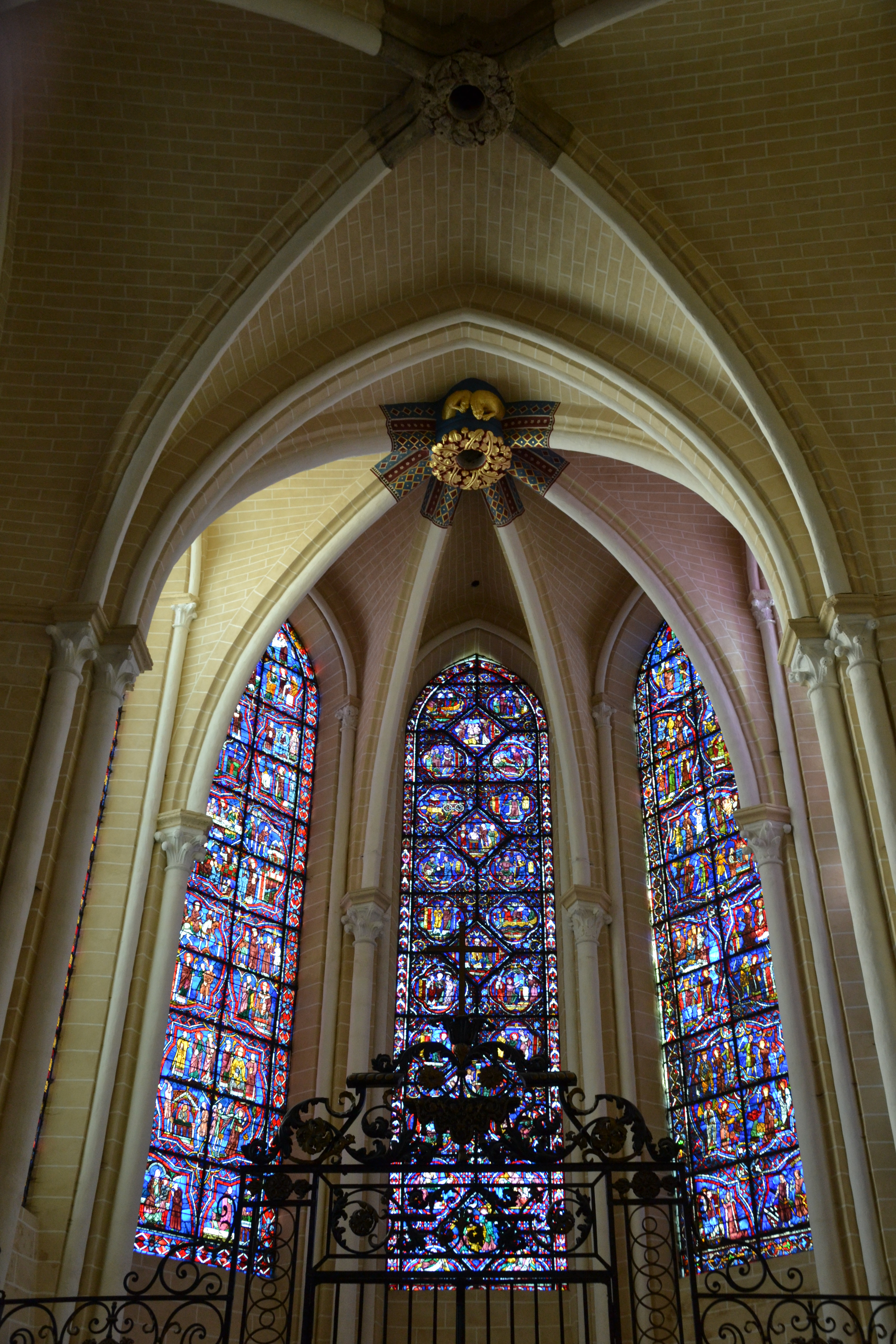
The window, hidden behind the right pillar.

The window is made up of four main circles, each on two registers. Those registers are made up of square panels showing the story and two border panels. Between each main circle is an intermediate register with a central quatrefoil with a square story panel at its centre, surrounded on both sides by two rectangular panels continuing the border and a half-quatrefoil also showing the story.

The four circles with a blue background are bordered by a red "orle", then a blue "orle" sown with yellow quatrefoil flowers and by a narrow band of white pearls.

== Background ==
Henry II of England made Thomas Becket chancellor of England in 1155, in which role he lived the life of a great lord. He then made him Archbishop of Canterbury in 1162, hoping he would submit the church to state power, but Thomas took the opposite course and was exiled to France, where he spent several long stays in Chartres, accompanied by his friend and secretary John of Salisbury, who in 1176 became Bishop of Chartres. In the meantime Thomas was murdered in Canterbury Cathedral by four of the king's knights in 1170 and canonised only three years later.

The window was made only fifty years after Becket's exile and martyrdom, during the final years of Philip II Augustus's reign, which also saw the struggle against local powers giving rise to the Kingdom of France. Philip had ejected Odo of Sully as archbishop of Paris after the latter spoke against Philip's divorce, leading Odo to put the kingdom under interdict. This gave a contemporary French resonance to the window's portrayal of Becket resisting a 'bad king' interfering in the Church, whereas a 'good king' should protect the Church.

== Differences ==
The window's composition is very different to others at Chartres, in which the main subject's story was told uninterrupted from bottom to top. That of Becket shows the saint's exile in the first main circle on the bottom two registers, whilst the third register shows the donors in an unusually high position (they were usually shown at the base and sides of the lowest register).

The main hagiography of Becket only begins in the fourth register onwards, with a halo only added on his deathbed after his martyrdom, though the exile images also show him with a halo. These anomalies suggest that the first main circle should be read as an independent narrative and a specific memorial to his visit to Chartres, perhaps even drawing on accounts of him by those who saw him there. This interpretation would make the register with the donors a border between the exile window and the main hagiography.

== Description ==
=== Thomas crosses to France ===
1a : Thomas Becket in Exile :

A man holding a club pushes Thomas out of town towards a tree, shown with its crenellations and open gate (opening conventionally shown in red). Thomas is shown with a halo in episcopal vestments with his episcopal mitre and cross.

His exile followed Henry II's promulgation on 30 January 1164 of the Constitutions of Clarendon, a collection of juridical procedures controlling the election of new prelates and gave royal courts the right to summon clergy. Becket was the only one to refuse to sign them and – accused of opposing royal authority – he decided to go into exile.

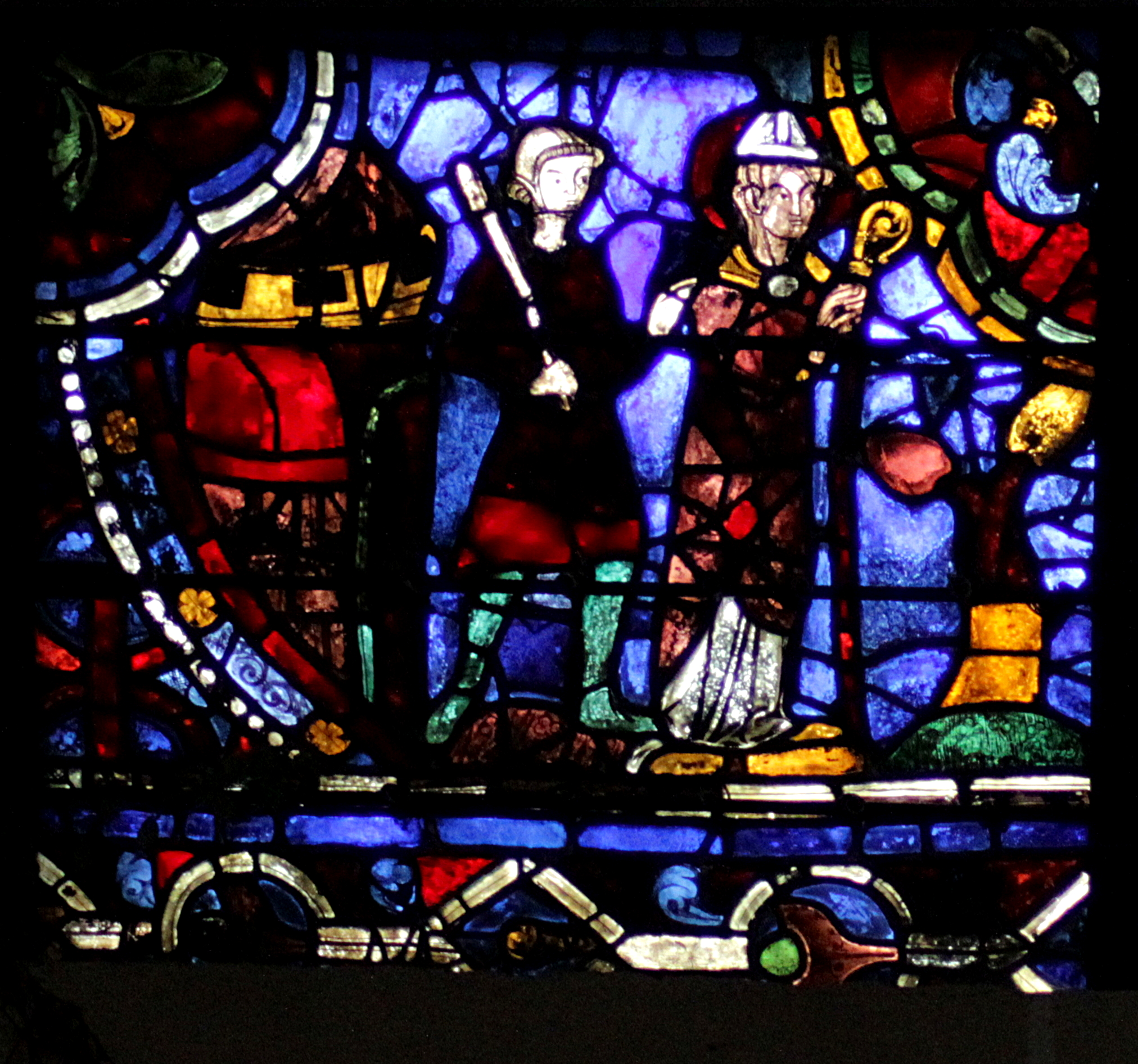
1b : Exile of Thomas Becket's Family and Friends :

Continuing 1a, it shows two men with clubs herding three men, a woman with a 'touret' hairstyle and two children before them. The first man in the centre carries a rectangular shape, possibly a book or a jewel-box. The treatment of the children's heads is unclear – one may be resting its head on the shoulder of another figure or the piece of glass may have been mis-assembled. The representation suggests an expulsion by force as a criticism of Henry, whereas in reality Thomas willingly chose exile.

"all the saint's friends and family, without distinction of condition or fortune, dignity or order, age or sex, were exiled like him" (from the collected Chartres liturgies — actus ergo in exilium).

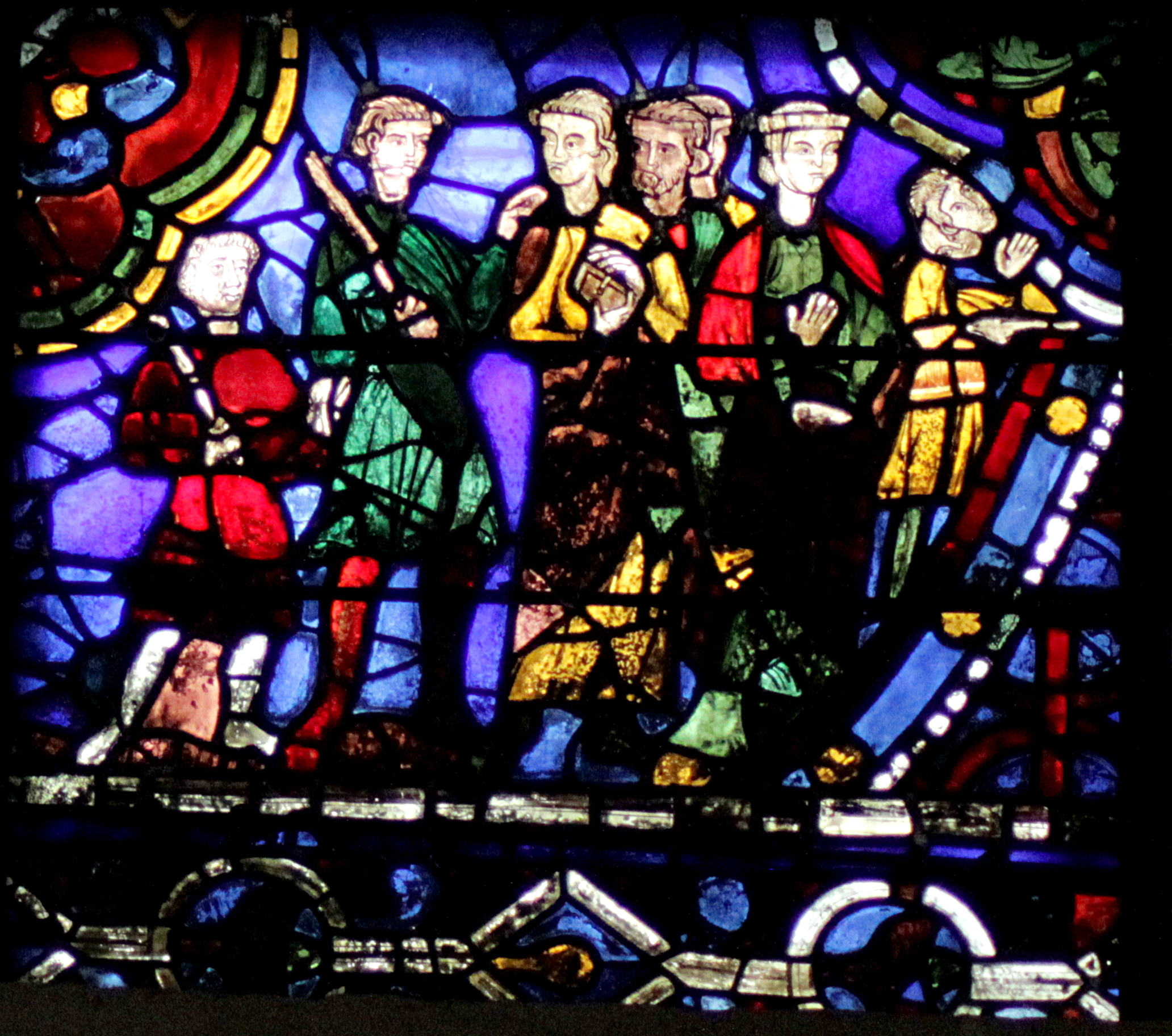
2a : Thomas Becket Meets Louis VII :

The collection of liturgies at Chartres states that Thomas disembarked at Wissant, a village to the south-west of Calais on the Côte d'Opale and that on his journey from there to Sens he met Louis VII of France at Soissons and talked amicably with him. The panel shows Thomas with his episcopal mitre, vestments and cross at the centre and Louis with his crown and sceptre, contrasting his good kingship with Henry's bad kingship in trying to impose his will on the Church.

To the left, behind Thomas, is a tonsured clergyman holding something in his right hand, possibly a gospel (attribute of a bishop, whose main mission was to evangelise) and making what seems to be the sign of peace with his left hand. Behind Thomas and the cleric is a stylised tree, meant to symbolise the meeting taking place outside the city walls, which contradicts the king's masonry throne, thought to symbolise the city of Soissons.

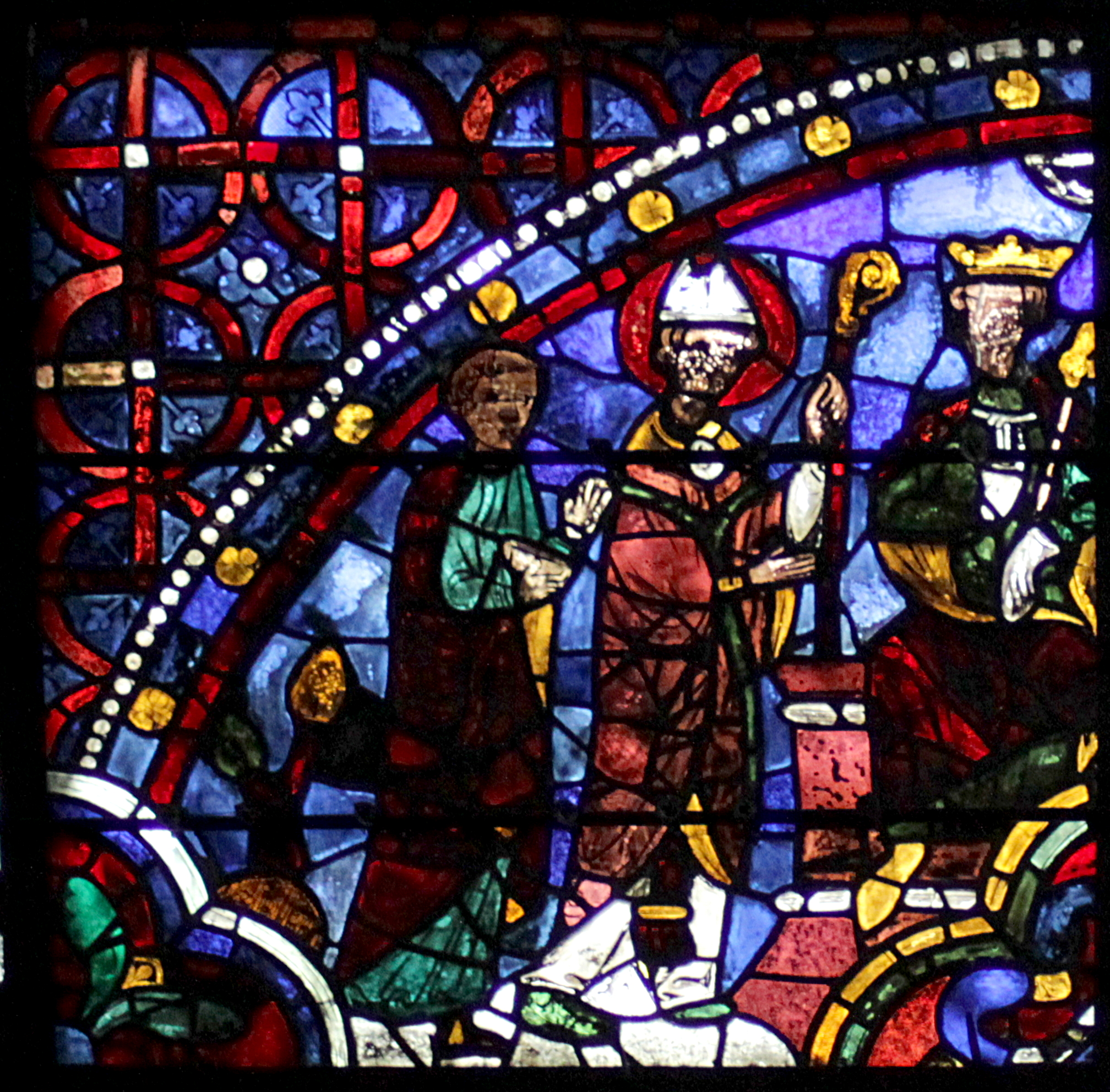
2b : Thomas Becket Enters a City :

Recognisable by his mitre, Thomas enters the city on horseback through a yellow doorway into the red inner city with a crenellated roof, talking to a man behind him, probably also on horseback.

The scene's significance is unclear, possibly showing his entry into Sens, where he placed himself under papal protection; or more probably his re-entry into Canterbury after his return from exile, a scene which also replies to the first panel of the exile account.

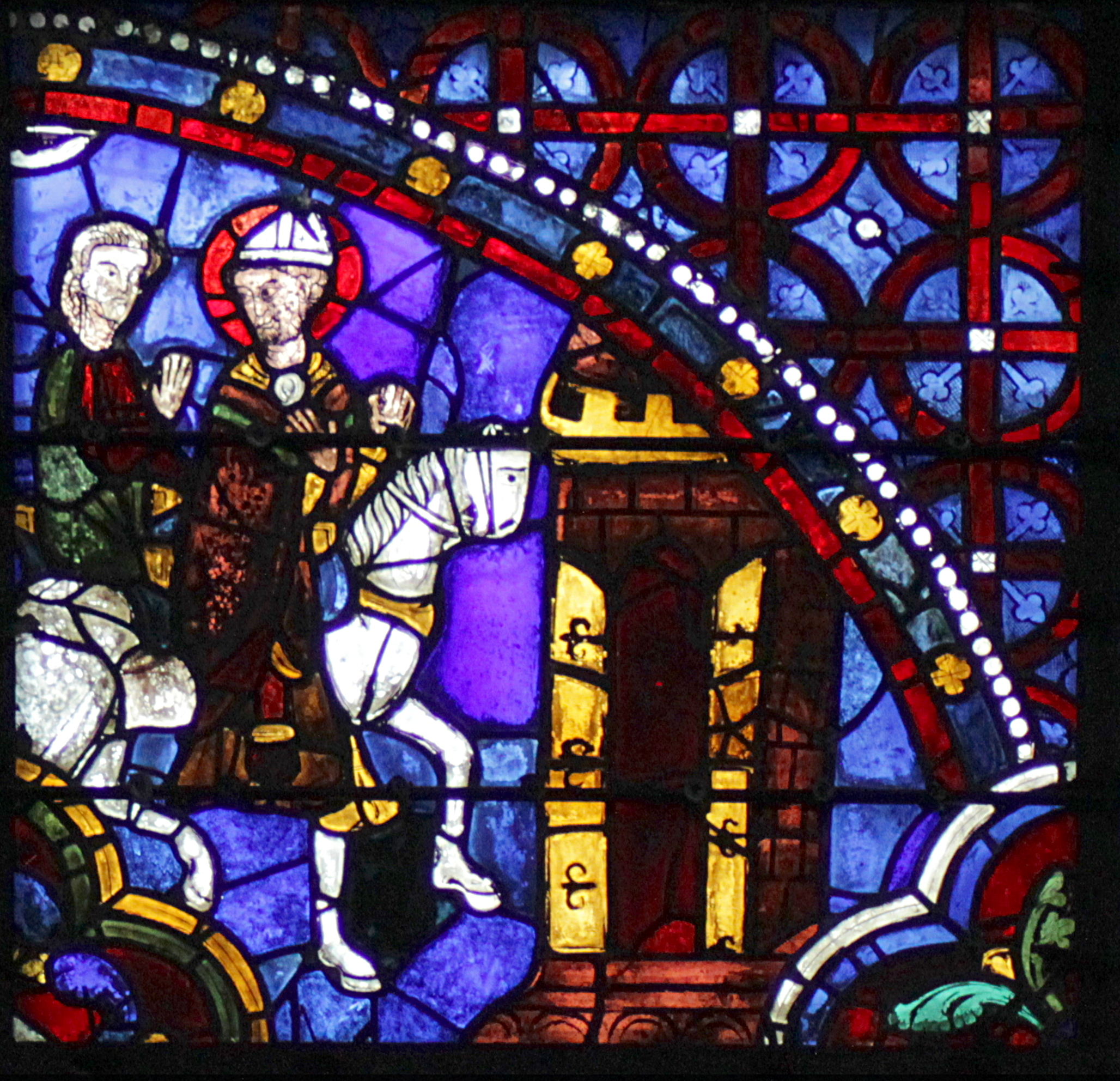

=== Life of Thomas Becket ===
The images quite faithfully follow the text of the office of matins for the feast of Thomas Becket on 29 December.

==== (i) Thomas, defender of the church ====
4a : Thomas Becket is consecrated archbishop :

"Thomas, born in London, in England, succeeded Théobald, Archbishop of Canterbury. He had previously honourably exercised the role of chancellor and showed himself strong and invincible in his episcopal duties."

Thomas had been a lay archdeacon whilst chancellor and was ordained priest the day before being consecrated as archbishop. To the left is Henry of Blois, Bishop of Winchester consecrating Thomas archbishop. Both men wear mitres and hold episcopal crosses, whilst Thomas is shown in the pallium, symbolic of his rank as archbishop and his position as Primate of England and actually only sent by the Pope after Thomas's consecration. Behind him two clerks assist in the ceremony, the one on the left holding a gospel (symbolising the bishop's central role of evangelising) and the other holding a box with three jars of holy chrism with which Thomas is about to be anointed. The cathedral interior is symbolised by columns and arcades.

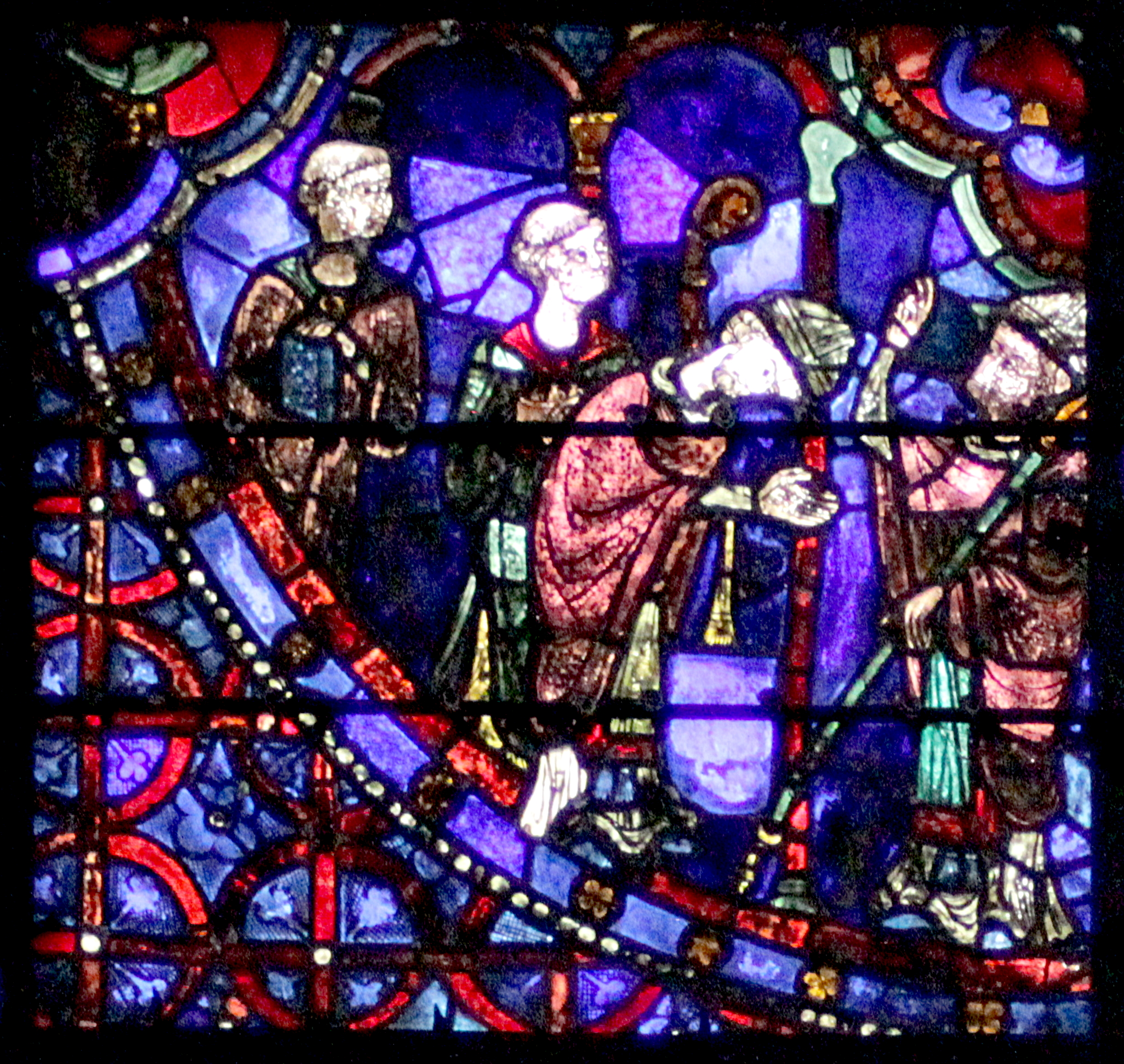
4b : Tensions between Thomas and Henry II :

"When Henry II, king of England wished to pass laws contrary to the Church's dignity and interest in an assembly of prelates and noblemen of his kingdom, Thomas opposed the king's cupidity"

The two men's discord arose from the Constitutions of Clarendon, by which Henry attempted to impose his authority on the English church. Behind the mitred Thomas is an albed clerk, again carrying a gospel. To the right Henry is shown higher than the other two figures on his throne, wearing a royal crown and resting his feet on a stool. Behind him, a yellow devil whispers bad advice into his ear, conventional iconography to show bad human behaviour as being guided by demons. The interior's decoration is symbolised by a column and two arcades, supporting a crenellated wall – behind the king is a window (whose opening is shown in red according to convention) through which is seen a covered tower.

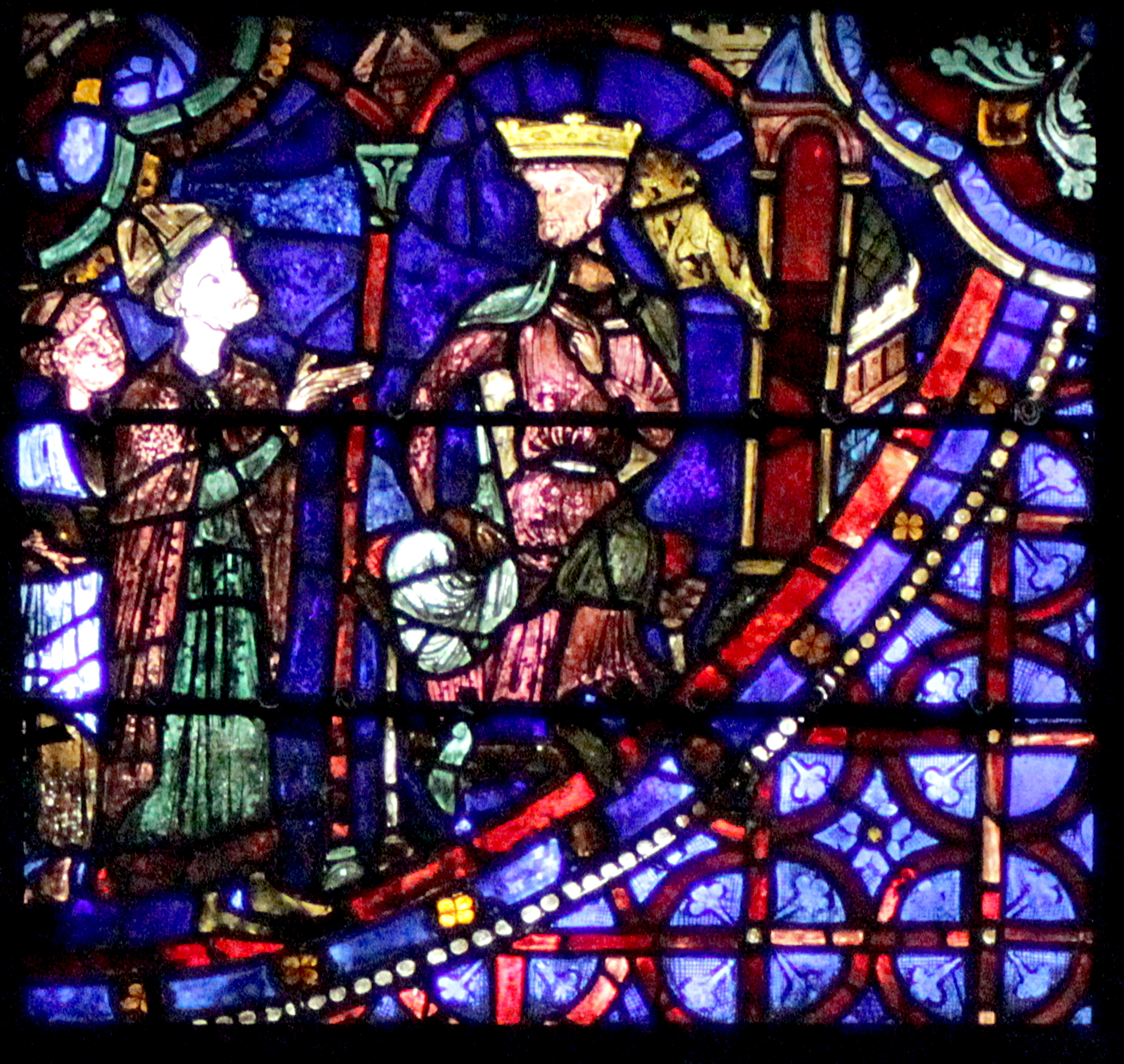
5a : Thomas Becket Leaves for Exile :

On the left panel, a hard-to-read group of monks assist in the mitred Thomas' departure. He is shown on horseback in the central panel, flanked by two monks also on horseback, riding towards the group on the left to take a last look at those he is leaving. The scene is flanked by two stylised trees representing a forest.

Thomas spent two years at Pontigny, ending in 1166, before returning to Sens, where he could spend his exile more safely.

6c : Thomas Meets Louis VII :

"and at the invitation of Louis, king of France, he went to stay with him"

The mitred archbishop and crowned king are shown in discussion. The visit was informal – Louis is shown without his sceptre and both figures are seated at the same height.

7a : Agreement Between the King of France and the Pope :

"He stayed there until, by the intervention of the Sovereign Pontiff and the king, he was recalled from exile"

From left to right are shown Alexander, Louis and Thomas in tiara, crown and mitre respectively, arranged in formal order, with the pope sitting higher than the king but Thomas sitting lower. The decoration evokes the interior of a palace, with a crenellated wall behind the king. The red panel is for once not an opening but represents the king's warrior role, in contrast to the praying role of the clergymen, represented by a blue background. The king's sceptre is over-large and more resembles a herald's mace, underlining his role as bearer of diplomatic messages.

Finally, on 22 July 1170, a patched-up peace was made between Thomas and Henry at Fréteval, allowing the archbishop to return to England. The situation still remained tense – Henry held a requiem mass as their mass of reconciliation and refused to give Thomas the symbolic kiss of peace.

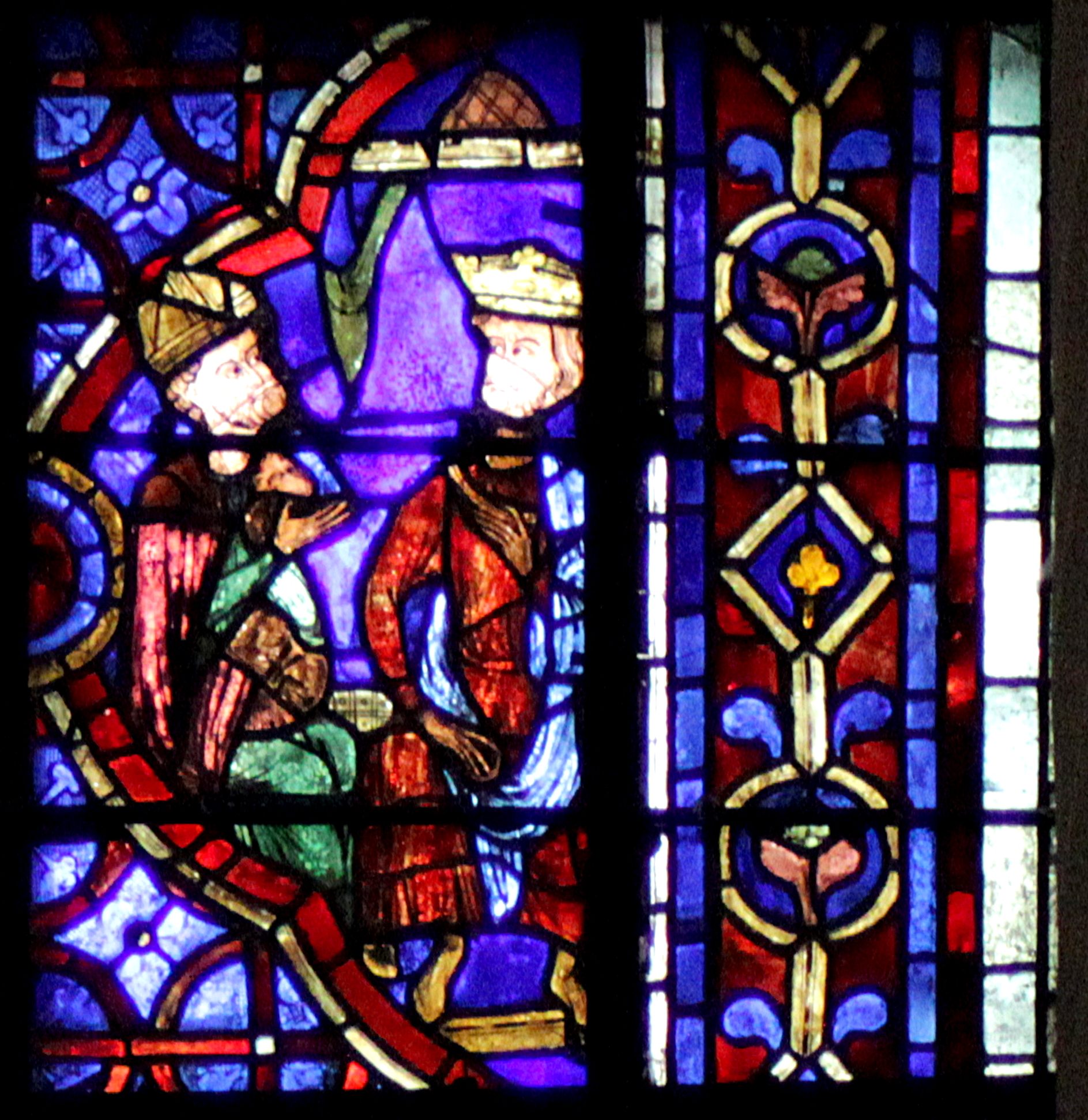
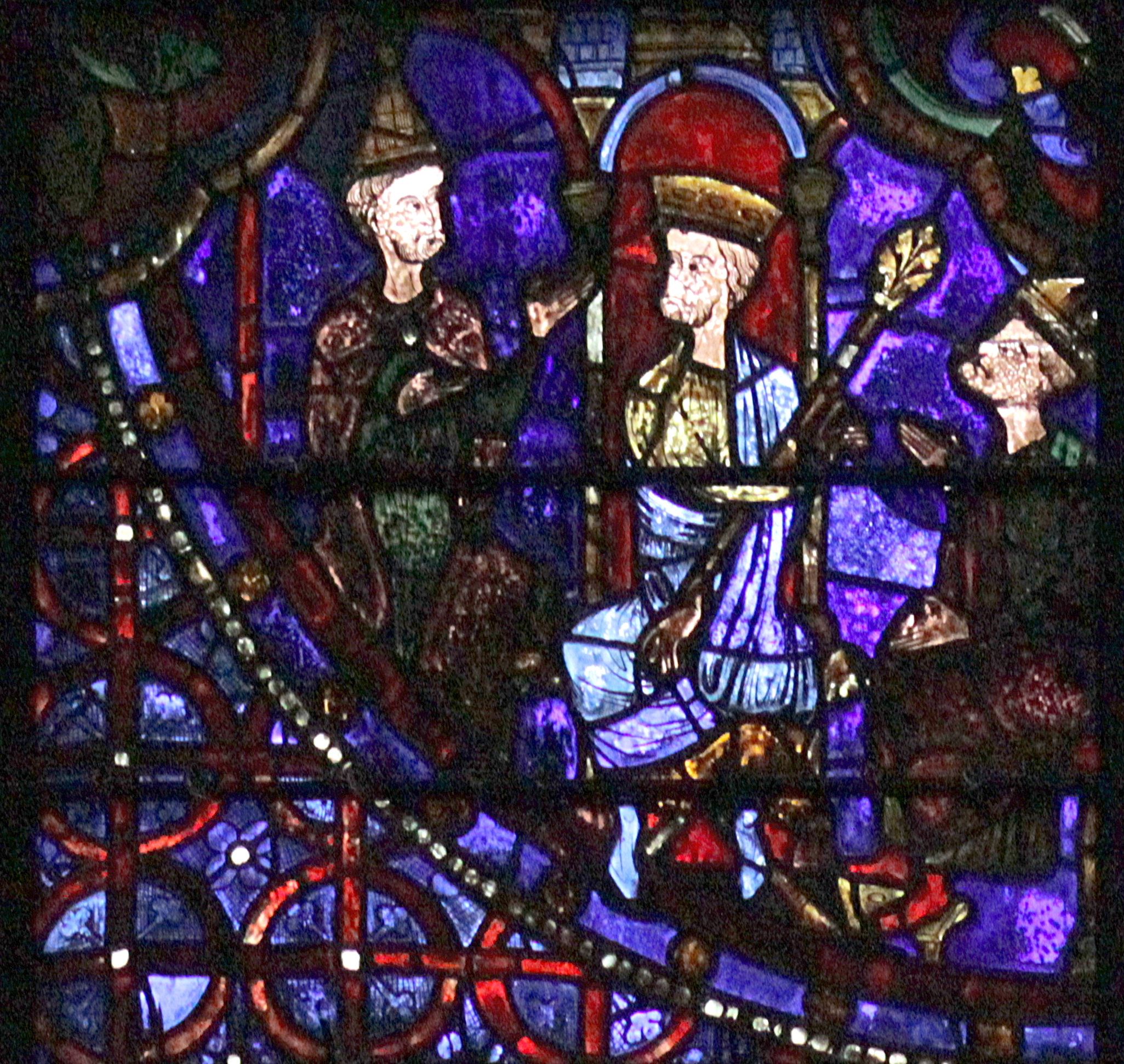

==== (iii) The conflict escalates ====
7b : Return to England :

"and he returned to England to the great satisfaction of the whole kingdom"

Getting out of a boat at Sandwich on 3 December 1170, the mitred archbishop this time carries his own gospel, with a clerk behind him. To the left a crowd welcomes him and presents him with a large processional cross, which recurs in the martyrdom scene.

The boat is the same as that in the fifth register, with a cross at the top of its mast, its pilot and its monstrous figurehead. However, the panel is still ambiguous – a logical reading would be that it shows Thomas' return to England (the wind-filled sail propels the boat towards the left), but the pilot would then be in the front of the boat, whereas he is shown at the back, though that may have been switched to accentuate the panel's symmetry with the image in the fifth register and thus emphasise Thomas returning the way he had come. He arrived in Canterbury two days later

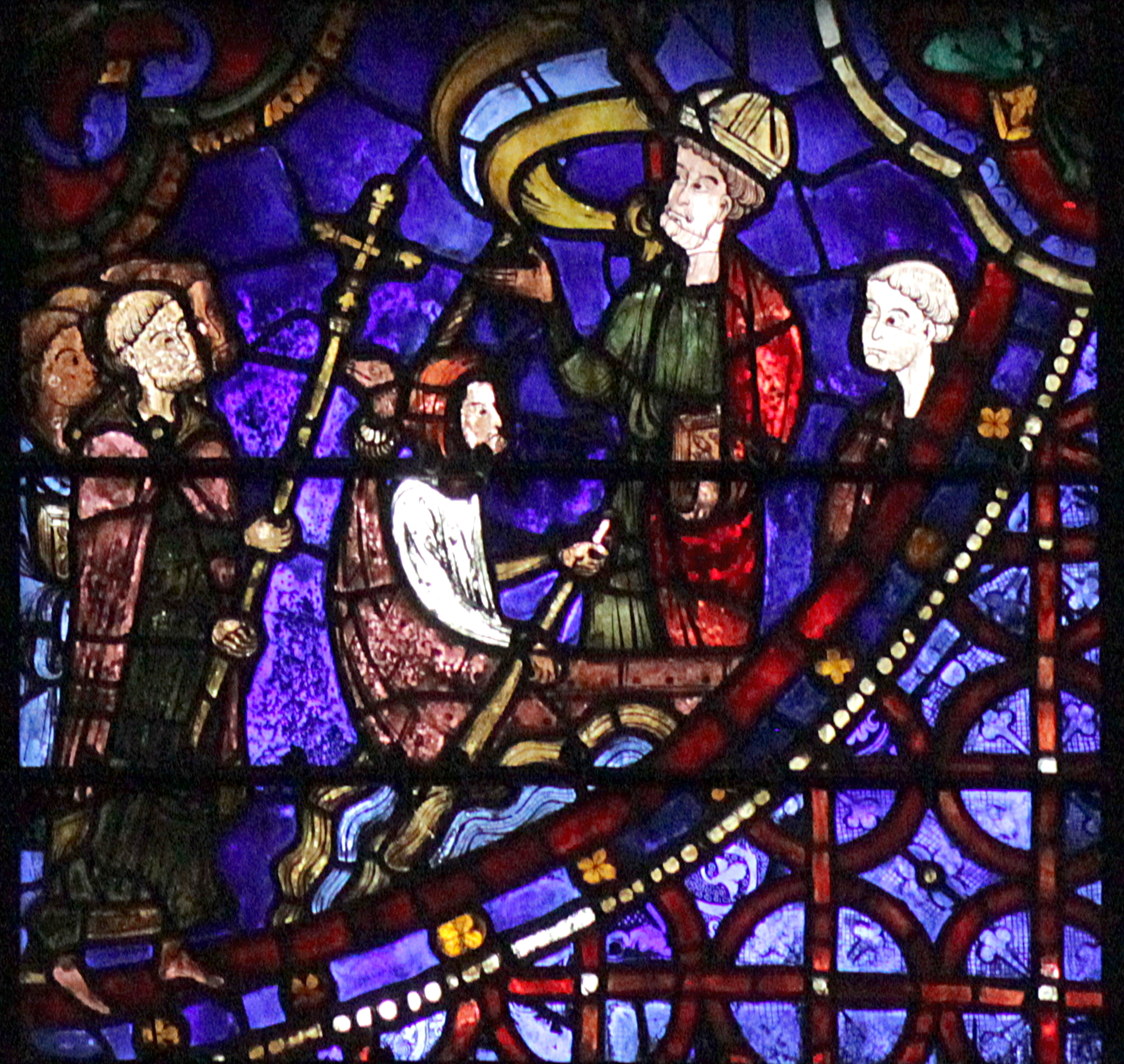
8a : Henry II and a Bishop

"As he applied himself fearlessly to fulfilling the duties of a good shepherd, slanderers came to tell the king that he planned many things against the kingdom and the public peace – as a result this prince often complained that, in this kingdom, there was a bishop with whom he could not be at peace"

At the left the crowned Henry is seated on a throne speaking to a mitred bishop carrying a gospel, with a tonsured priest behind the bishop holding his episcopal cross. Two columns support two arches and a crenellated frieze, whilst to the left is a roofed and crenellated tower.

The bishop shown may be the Archbishop of York, whom Henry commanded to crown his son during his lifetime, a major cause of controversy with Thomas since royal coronations were normally the prerogative of the Archbishop of Canterbury. However, that coronation occurred on 14 June 1170, long before Thomas' return to England, leading him to excommunicate the Archbishop of York and the Bishops of London and Salisbury who had taken part. It is more likely that the bishop shown is one of these three bishops complaining to Henry of his excommunication.

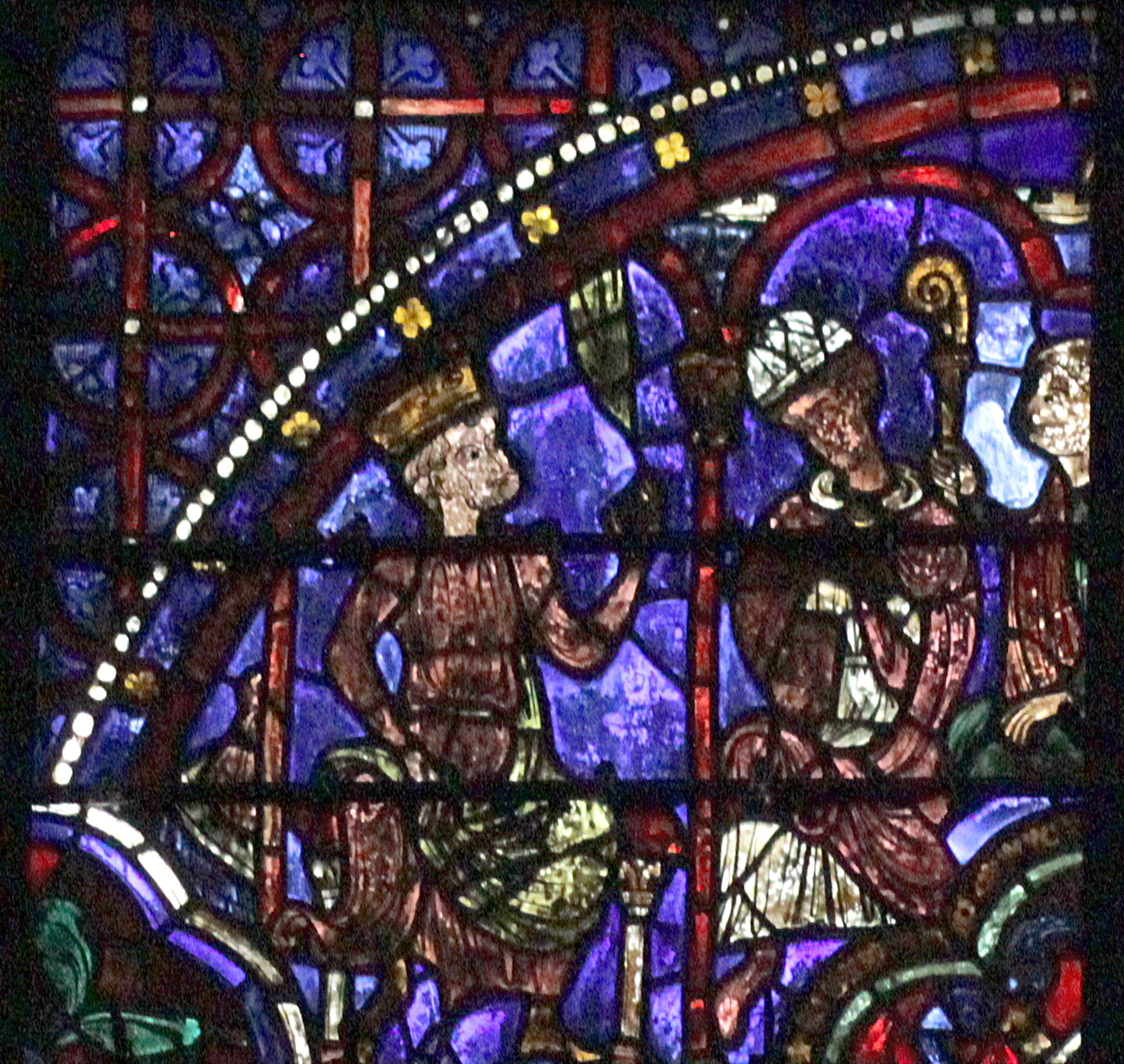
8b : Henry's Anger :

Thomas is shown in his mitre, his left hand open and the index finger of his right hand pointing in a gesture of request. A figure to the right with a crown and sceptre turns away in anger. Two figures stand between them, the one in the foreground showing the king to the archbishop, perhaps introducing him or perhaps telling him of the king's refusal to meet with him.

The crowned figure may be Thomas' former pupil Henry III or Henry II, but it is more likely the scene continues the previous one, showing Henry II still furious at the bishops' excommunication and making the outburst which led the four knights to head for Canterbury. This latter interpretation would make the middle figures two of the four knights. Whichever interpretation is correct, panels 8a and 8b both show the leading English clergy's role in the tensions, with Henry II refusing to receive Thomas but welcoming the excommunicated bishops.

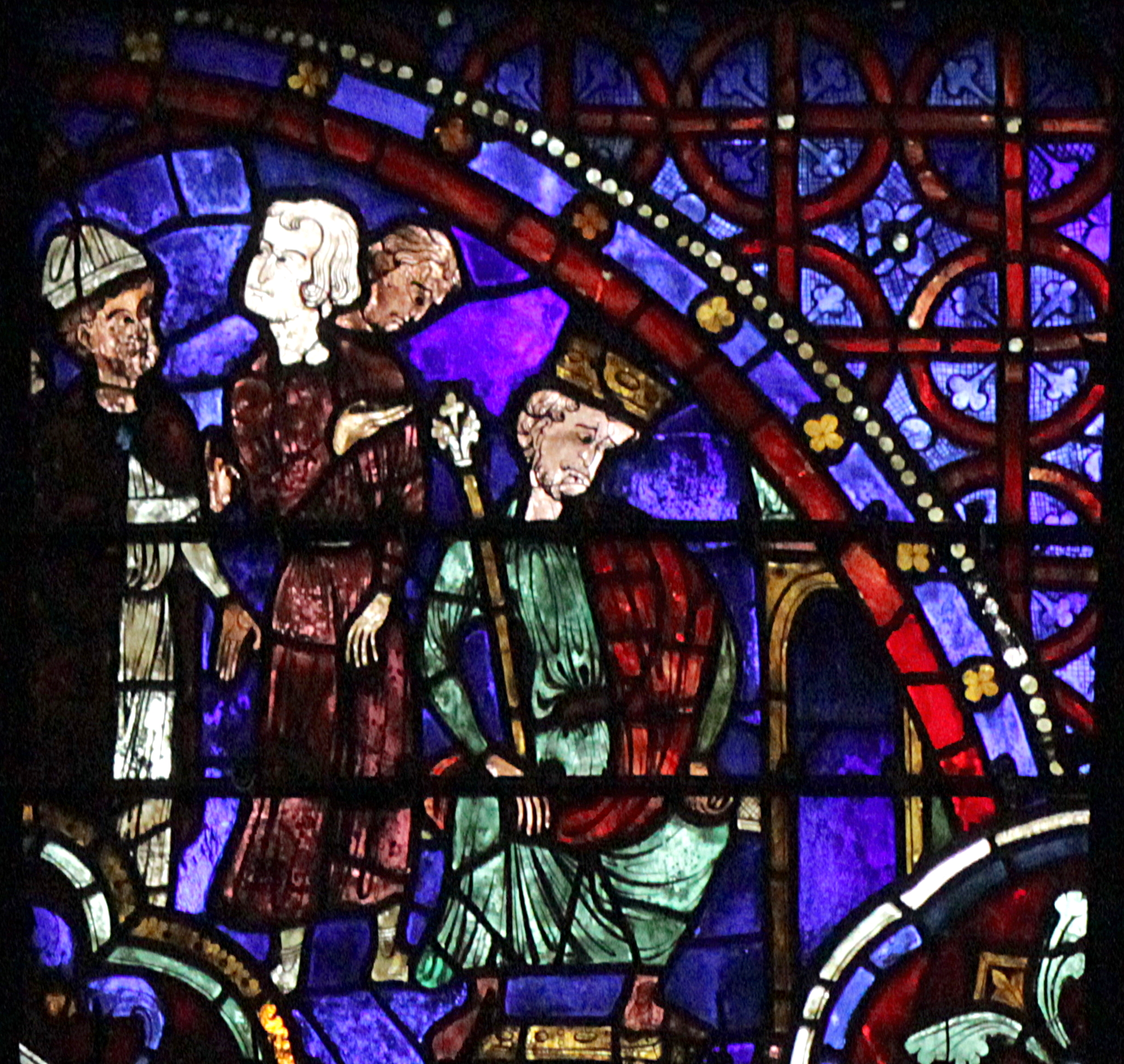
9a : Four Knights Menace Thomas :

"These words of the king made some detestable hangers-on believe they would give great pleasure to the king by killing Thomas, and so they secretly went to Canterbury"

Thomas is shown mitred and enthroned, with his feet on a stool. Two men point a finger at him in challenge, with a third figure behind them. They are three of the four Anglo-Norman knights (Reginald Fitzurse, Hugh de Morville, William de Tracy and Richard the Breton) who went to Canterbury to demand that Thomas appear before the king to answer for his actions – Thomas refused.

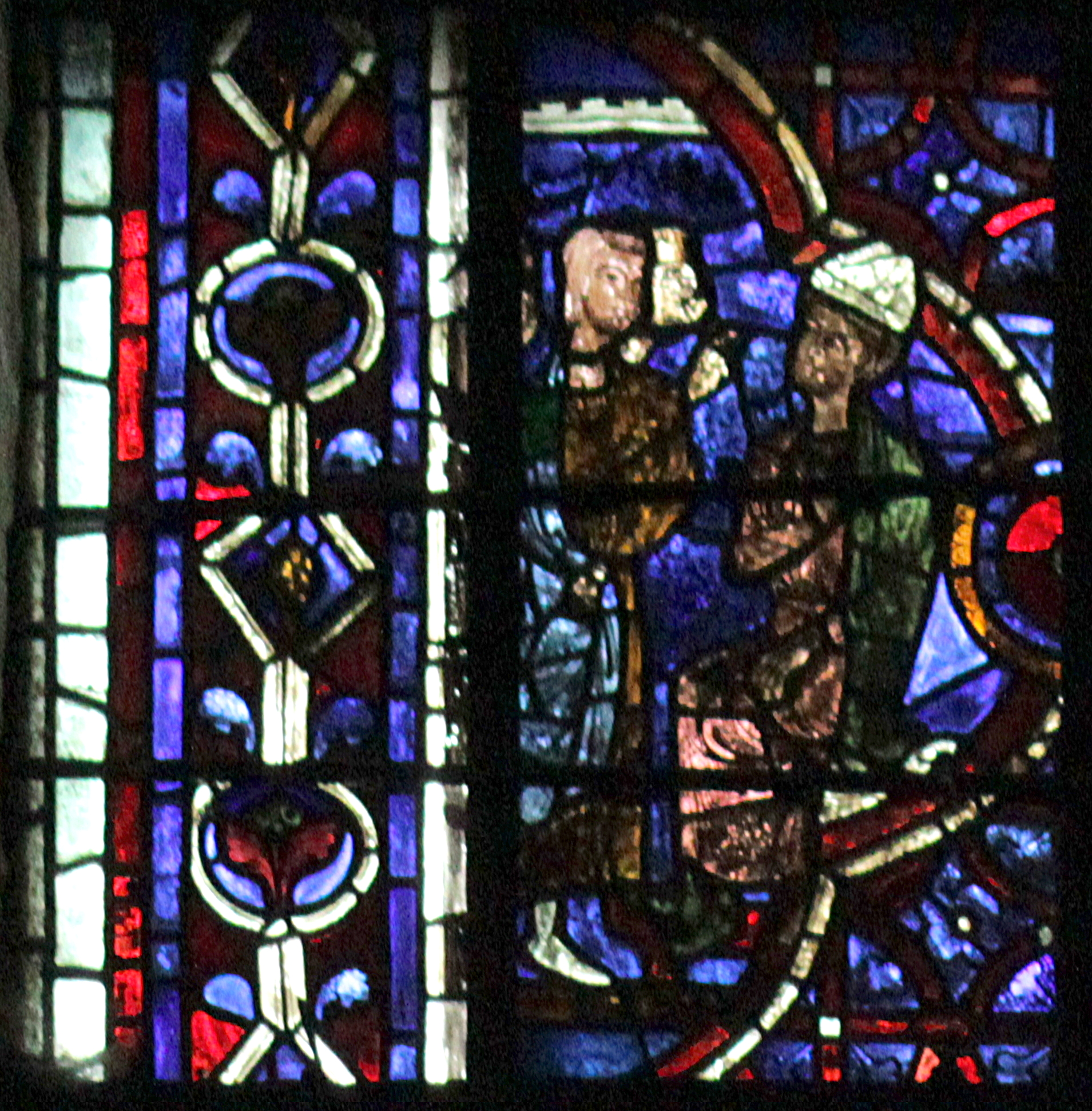

==== (iv) Murder in the Cathedral ====
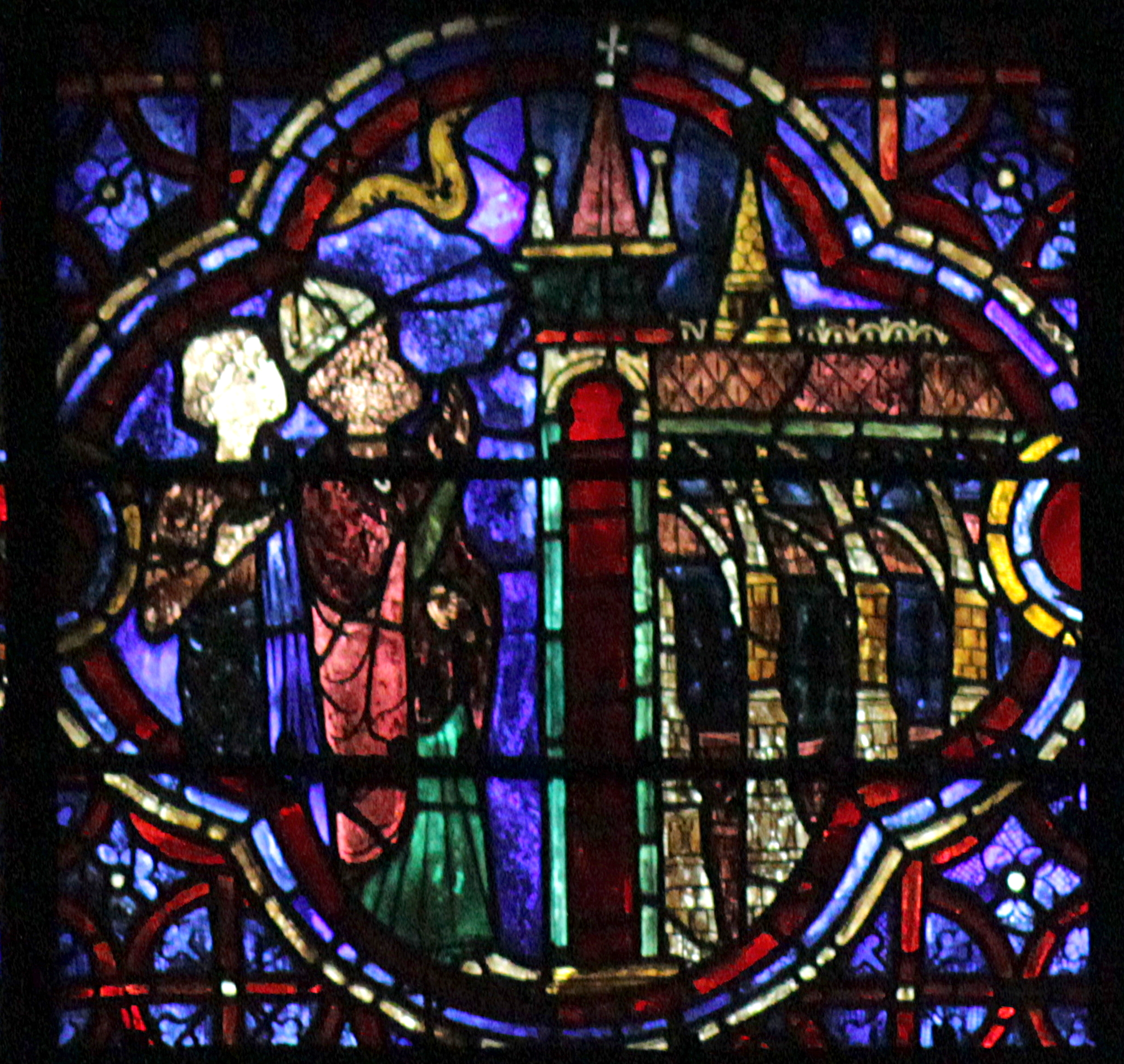
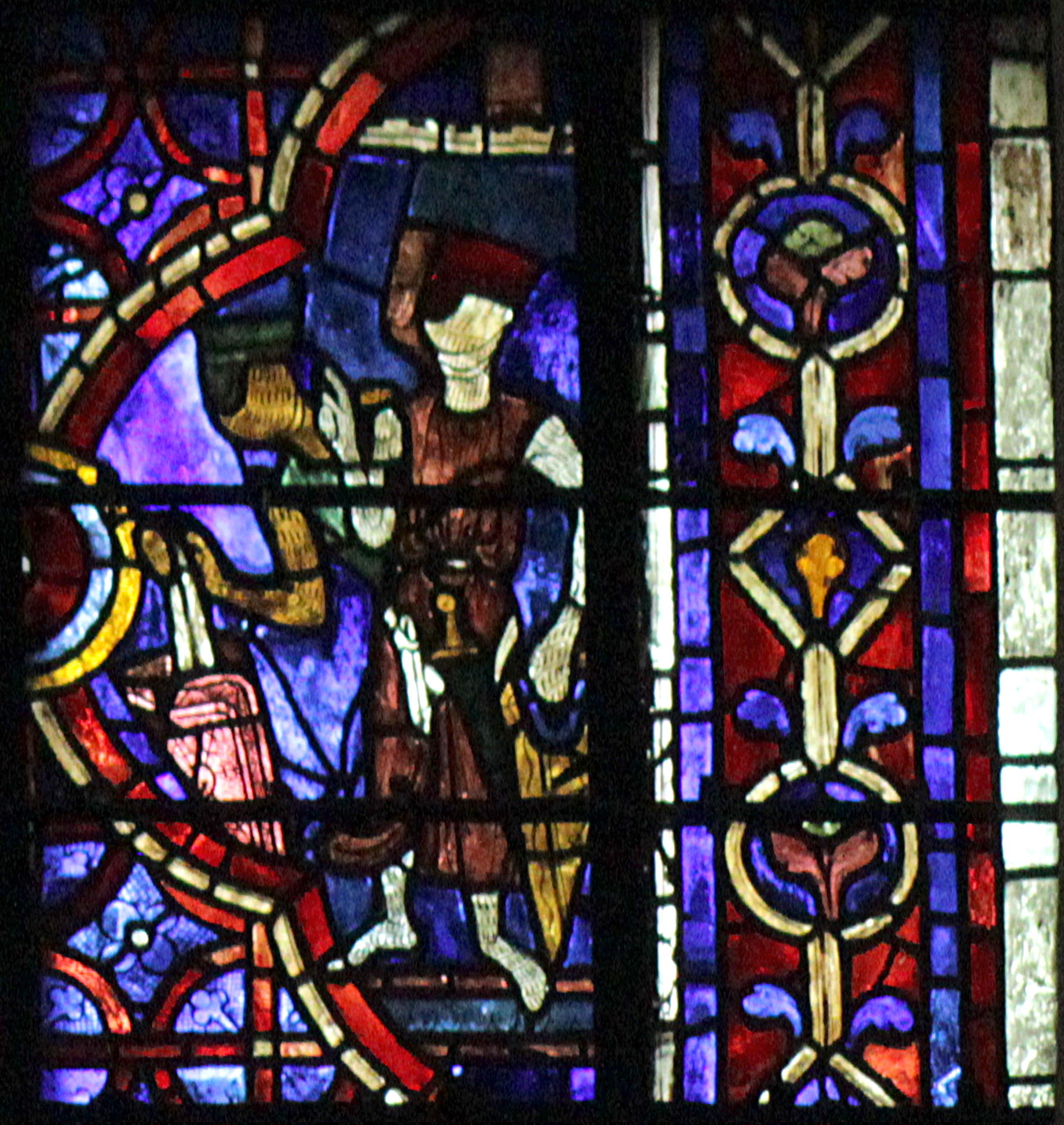
9b&c : The knights ambush Thomas : "and they went to attack the Archbishop, in the same church where he was celebrating the Office of Vespers. The clerks wanted to close the church doors, but Thomas ran to open them himself, saying to his own "God's church must not be guarded like a camp – as for me, I shall willingly suffer death for God's Church."

The mitred bishop leads a clerk towards the cathedral, which is shown with a red door and double flying buttresses in the Gothic style of the new cathedral at Chartres (in Thomas' time Canterbury Cathedral was still a piece of Romanesque architecture). The scene is outside, as demonstrated by the crenellated ridge on the roof. To the right the knights lie in wait in their helmets, mailcoats and shields without coats of arms. The murder occurred whilst Thomas was on his way to Vespers.

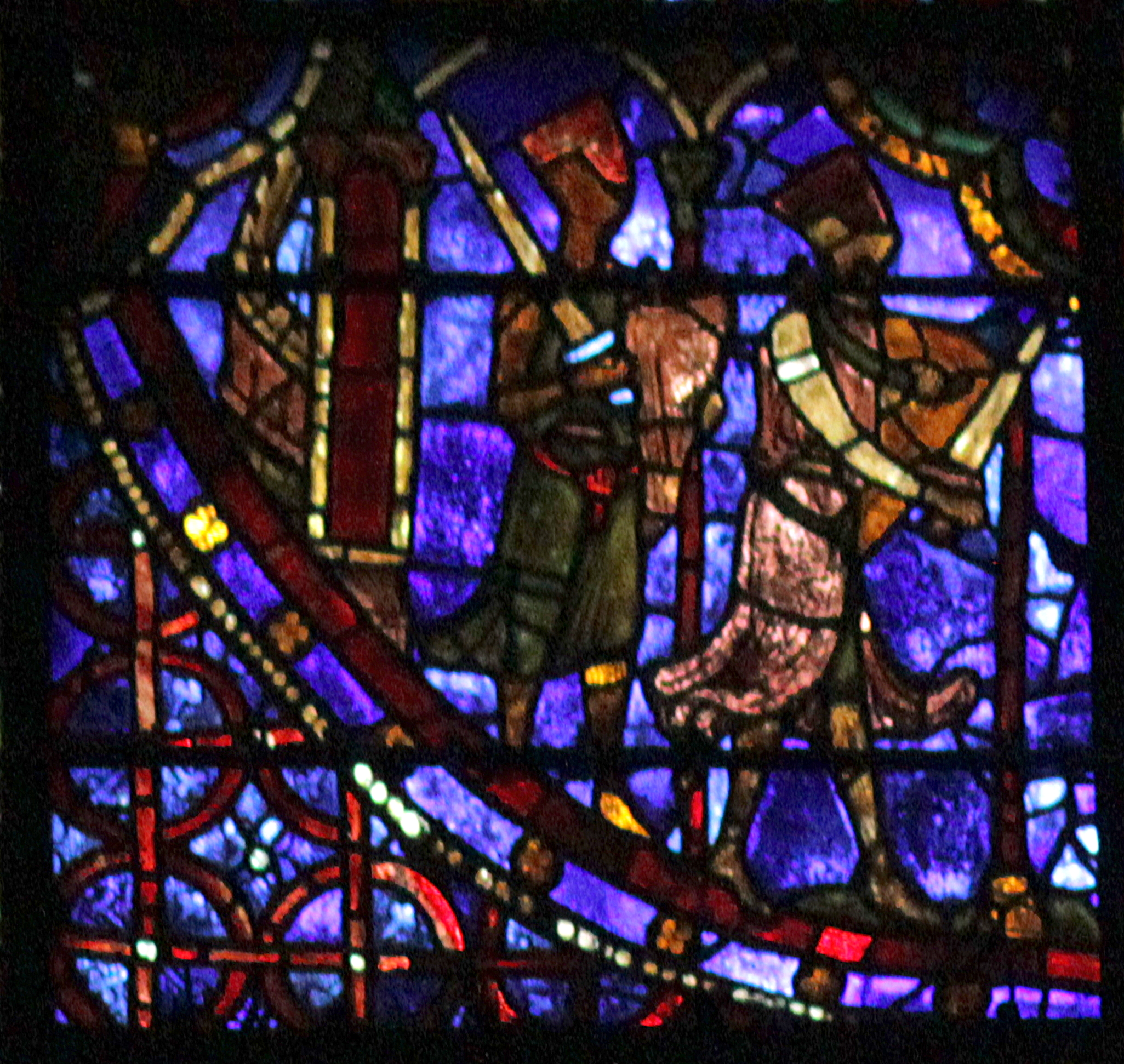
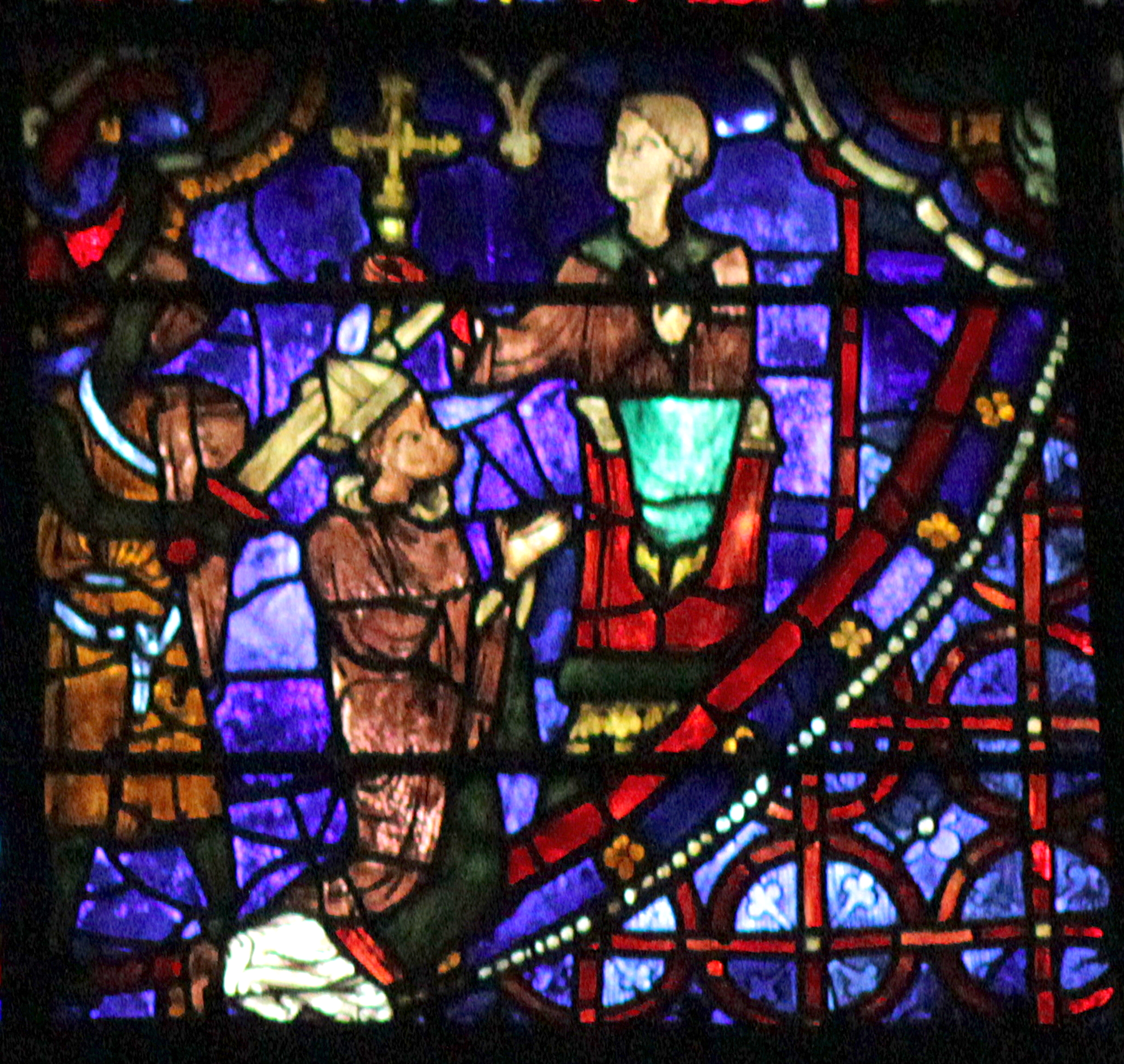
10: Thomas is murdered : "Then, addressing the soldiers, he said "In God's name, I forbid you to touch my people". He then fell to his knees, and after entrusting the Church and his soul to God, Blessed Mary, Saint Denis and other patron saints of his cathedral, he offered up his head to the sacrilegious iron, with the same constancy with which he had resisted the king's most unjust laws... This occurred on the fourth day before the Kalends of January, year of Our Lord 1170; and the Martyr's brains sprang from the church floor."

These two panels read as a single scene, with Romanesque arches evoking the cathedral interior. To the left is the red door just passed through by the knights, whilst to the far right is an altar, evoking Christ's sacrifice, although the murder actually occurred in a transept near the stairs up to the choir. As conventional in images of the murder, Thomas is shown kneeling, with Fitzurse making the final blow into his head and mitre, slicing off the top of his skull and wounding Edward Grim, shown holding the episcopal cross, who later wrote an account of the murder. Behind Fitzurse are the other three knights.

11 : Thomas' tomb :

"God soon honoured [Thomas] with a great number of miracles and so the same Pope Alexander inscribed him among the number of the Saints"

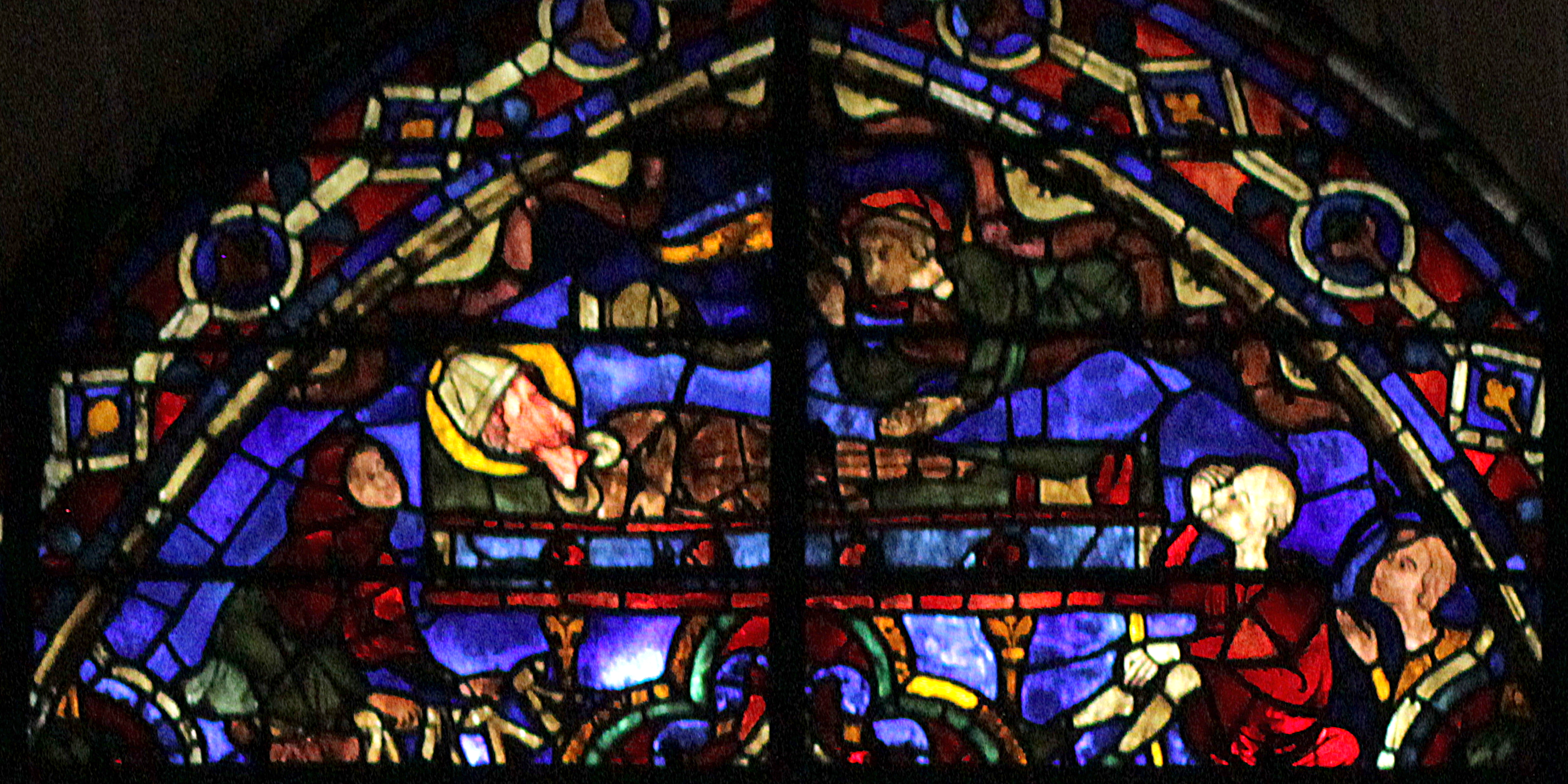

The last scene shows not Thomas' burial but the initial miracles at his tomb. He is shown with a halo resting on a tomb supported by columns, allowing pilgrims to pass below it. To the left a sick man rests on his crutches, whilst to the right a blind man holds his hands to his eyes. Above an angel with a red halo (the liturgical colour of martyrdom) censes the saint. In the angel's left hand is a circular loaf, symbolising the "bread of angels" from Psalm 78, 24 ("he rained manna on them for food, he gave them the bread of heaven") and thus evoking God's response to the martyr's intercession.
