= Peter Cellensis =

French Benedictine and bishop

- Church: Roman Catholic
- Diocese: Chartres
- Appointed: 1181

Personal details
- Born: c. 1115; Troyes
- Died: 20 February 1183; Chartres

Peter Cellensis, also known as Peter of Celle, Peter of Celles, Pierre de Celle and Peter de la Celle, (c. 1115 in Troyes – 20 February 1183, at Chartres) was a French Benedictine and bishop.

== Life ==
He was born into an aristocratic family of Champagne and educated in the Cluniac Priory of Saint-Martin-des-Champs at Paris. He spent part of his youth at Provins with his long-term friend John of Salisbury. Became a Benedictine, and in 1150 was made Abbot of "La Celle" in Saint-André-les-Vergers, near Troyes, where he got his surname, Cellensis.

In 1162 he was appointed Abbot of St. Rémy at Reims, and in 1181 he succeeded John of Salisbury as Bishop of Chartres. He was highly regarded by many other churchmen of his time such as Thomas Becket, Pope Eugene III and Pope Alexander III.

== Works ==
His literary productions were edited by Janvier and reprinted in Patrologia Latina (202:405-1146),. They consist of 177 epistles, 95 sermons, and four treatises. The treatises were titled:

- Epistola ad Joannem Saresberiensem
- De panibus
- Mystica et moralis expositio Mosaici tabernaculi
- De conscientia
- Tractatus de disciplina claustrali

His letters were edited separately and are believed to be valuable from an historical standpoint.

According to the Catholic Encyclopedia (1913), his sermons and treatises "are extremely bombastic and allegorical".

In addition to the four treatises (De Disciplina Claustrali, De Conscientia, De Puritate Animae and De Affiictione et Lectione), Peter of Celle composed five commentaries (two on Ruth, two on the Tabernacle of Moses and De Panibus, an account of the references to bread in the Bible). (Note: These works appear in PL ccii. 397–1146) An account of them appears in Marcel Viller et al., Dictionnaire de Spiritualité, 14 vols to date, Paris 1937.

== Modern editions ==
- Peter of Celle, Selected Works: Sermons, the School of the Cloister, On Affliction and Reading, On Conscience, trans Hugh Feiss, CS, (Kalamazoo, MI: Cistercian Publications, 1987)
- Peter of Celle, The Letters of Peter of Celle, ed. and trans. Julian Haseldine (Oxford, OUP, 2001)
