= Leobinus =

French saint, hermit, abbot and bishop

Saint Leobinus
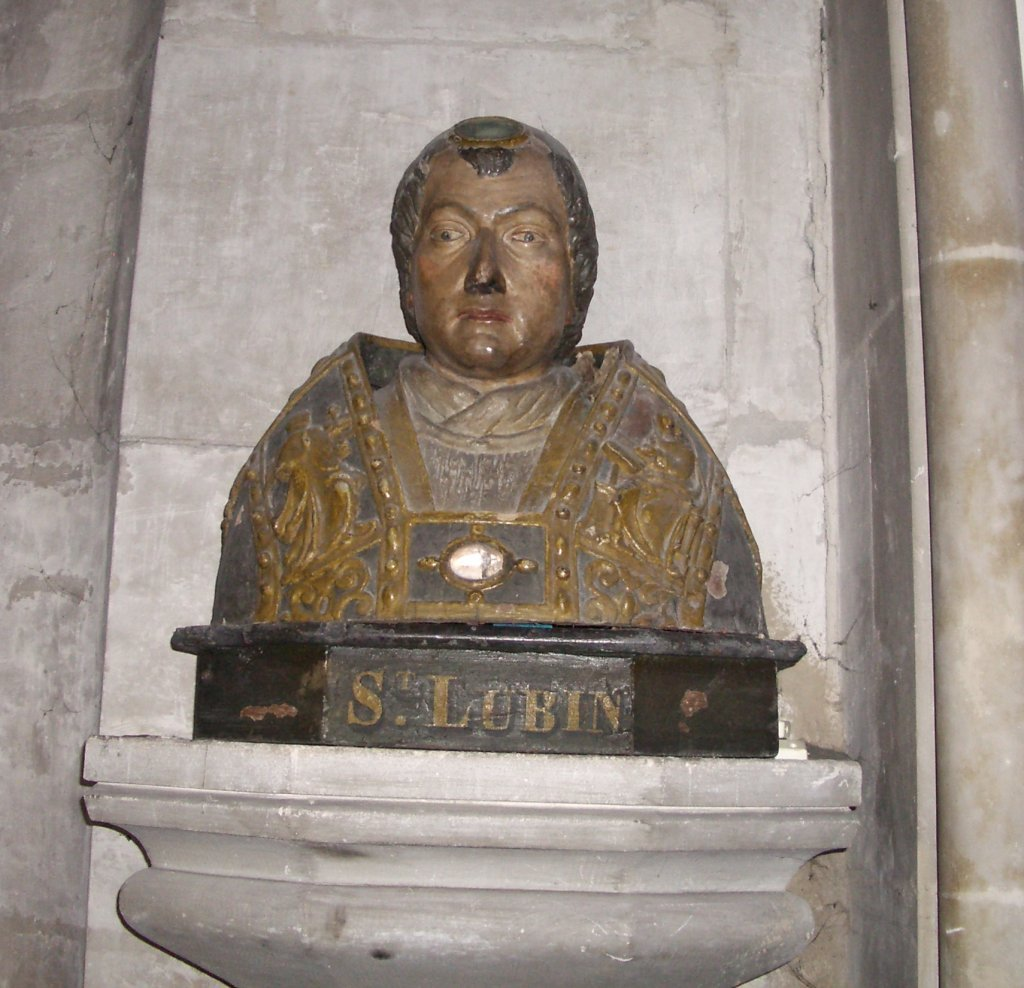
- Bust of Saint Leobinus. Church of Notre Dame de Louviers.
- Died: 556 AD
- Venerated in: Roman Catholic Church, Orthodox Church
- Feast: 14 March (formerly 15 September)
- Attributes: depicted on his death-bed receiving the last rites from his successor Saint Caletric

Saint Leobinus (French: Lubin) (died 14 March 557) was a hermit, abbot, and bishop. Born in a peasant family, he became a hermit and a monk of Micy Abbey before being ordained a priest. He was then elected abbot of Brou and in 544, became Bishop of Chartres, succeeding Etherius with the consent of king Childebert I.
