= Jacques Lescot =

French bishop

Jacques Lescot O.S.A.
- Bishop of Chartres
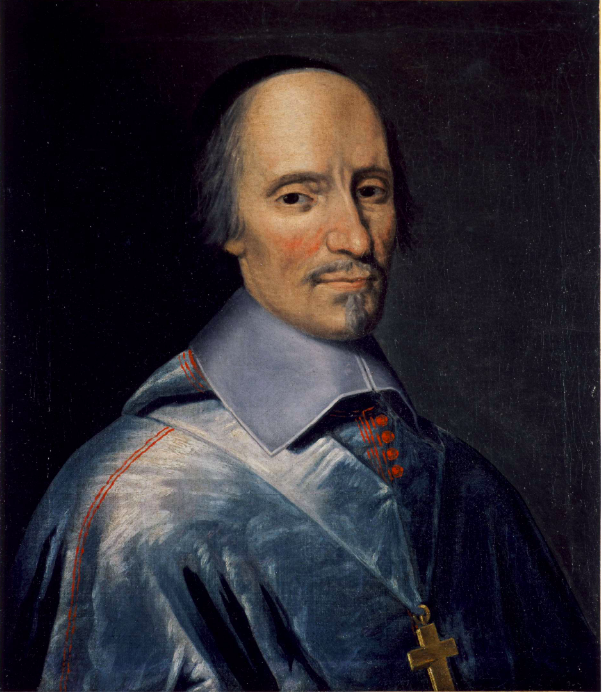
- Portrait of Jacques Lescot byPhilippe de Champaigne (1642)
- Church: Catholic Church
- Diocese: Diocese of Chartres
- In office: 22 June 1643 – 22 August 1656
- Predecessor: Léonore d'Étampes de Valençay
- Successor: Ferdinand de Neufville de Villeroy

Orders
- Consecration: 8 November 1643 by Léonore d'Étampes de Valençay

Personal details
- Born: 1 August 1594 Saint-Quentin, Picardy, Kingdom of France
- Died: 22 August 1656 (aged 62)

Jacques Lescot (1 August 1594 – 22 August 1656) was Bishop of Chartres from June 1643 to 1656.

== See also ==
- List of bishops of Chartres
