= Calétric of Chartres =

6th-century French bishop and saint

- Bishop of Chartres
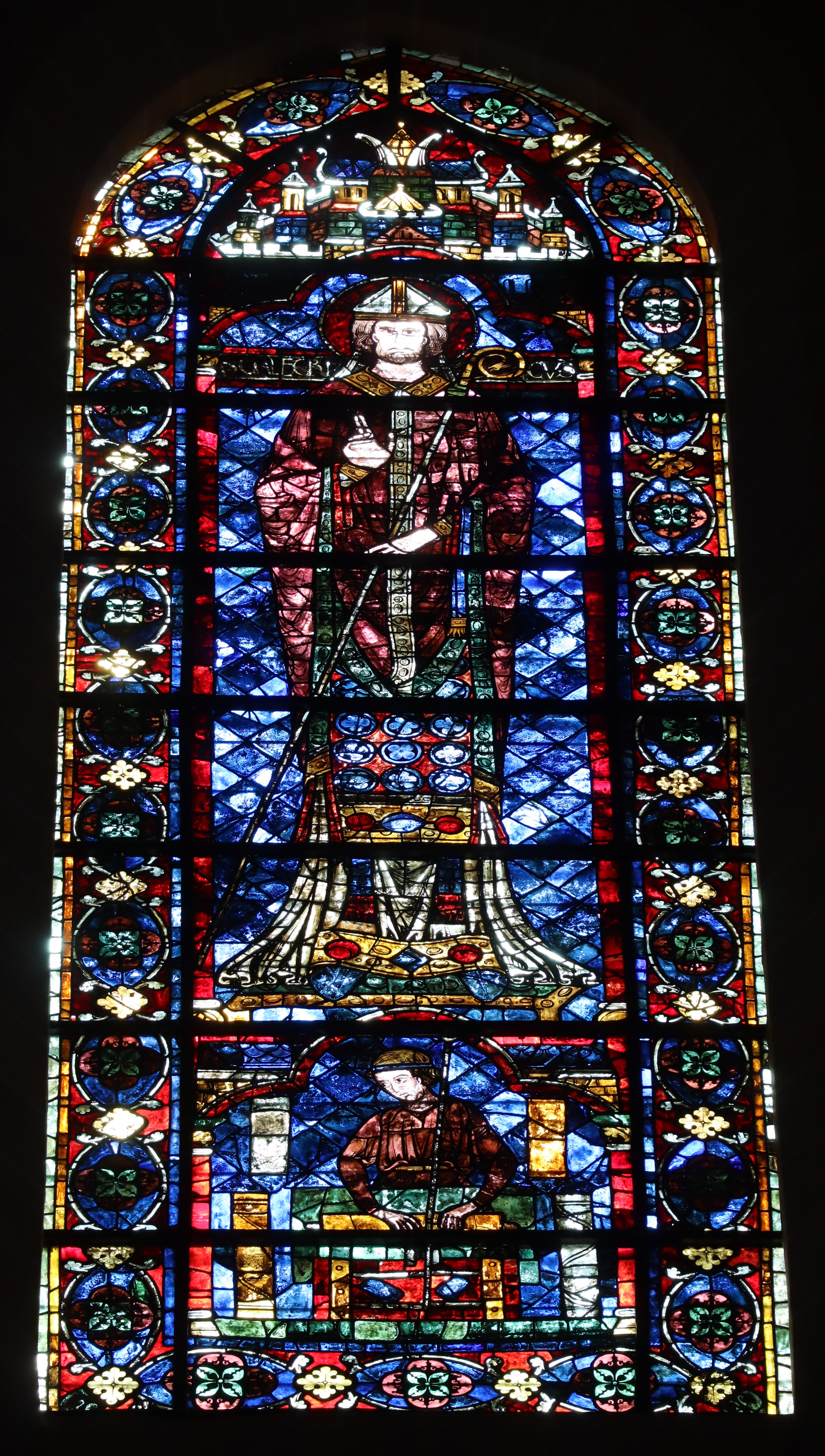
- Stained-glass window of Calétric in Chartres Cathedral (bay # 134, right lancet)
- Diocese: Roman Catholic Diocese of Chartres

Personal details
- Died: c. 573

Sainthood
- Feast day: 4 September (Roman martyrology); 8 October (Diocese of Chartres)
- Venerated in: Catholic Church

Calétric or Colétric of Chartres was a 6th-century French bishop and saint. His name is also spelled as Caletricus, Chaletricus or Chalactericus (in Venantius Fortunatus) whilst in French, it appears in the popular forms of Caltry or Calais, probably caused by the confusion with the abbot-saint of Le Maine. His feast day is on 4 September.

His predecessor as bishop of Chartres was Lubin of Chartres, who was last mentioned in 551. Caletric died before 573, the year when his successor Pappolus took part in a council in Paris. However, as the council was called by Sigebert I on splitting the diocese of Chartres, Calétric probably died shortly before the council started. According to Fortunatus, he died at the age of 38.

Calétric is only contemporaneously known from his attendance at two other councils held - one in Paris sometime between 557 and 563, and the other in Tours in 567 or 568. He also appeared in a 9th-century work entitled Life of Saint Lubin, which stated that he was once a young priest of noble birth, with a sister named Mallegonde.
