= Boetharius =

Boetharius Boetharius of Chartres Saint Boetharius (also known as Béthaire, Berthaire, Betharius, or Bohaire; died c. 623 AD) was an early Merovingian prelate who served as the Bishop of Chartres from approximately 594 AD until his death. He is venerated as a saint in both the Catholic Church and the Eastern Orthodox Church, with his feast day observed on August 2.

Early Life and Education Italian Origins: According to medieval historical records, Boetharius was born in Italy.

Studies at Chartres: He traveled to Gaul to pursue sacred studies at Chartres under Bishop Pappolus (Pappol) around 573 AD.

Master of Divinity: Recognizing his scholarship, Bishop Pappolus designated Boetharius as the chief theological instructor and schoolmaster of Chartres. This early educational infrastructure contributed to the foundation of what would later develop into the famous School of Chartres. Episcopate and Political Role Bishop of Chartres: Boetharius succeeded Pappolus as Bishop of Chartres around 594 AD.

Royal Chaplain: He served as a spiritual advisor and royal chaplain to Clotaire II, King of Neustria and later sole ruler of the Franks. Captivity Under Theuderic II: Due to intense Merovingian dynastic rivalries between Neustria and Burgundy, Boetharius was captured and briefly imprisoned by King Theuderic II of Burgundy before being released. Defense of Chartres: Regional tradition and ecclesiastical history record that Boetharius played an active role in defending the city of Chartres during a military siege during the Merovingian conflicts. Veneration and Legacy Feast Day: August 2.

Chartres Cathedral Iconography: Boetharius is depicted alongside other early Merovingian bishop-saints in the stained-glass windows of Chartres Cathedral (specifically Window 141AB). His relics were historically preserved in a shrine on the tribune des corps saints inside the cathedral.

Toponymy: The commune of Saint-Bohaire in the Loir-et-Cher department of central France is named in his honor.
