= Charles-François des Montiers de Mérinville =

French clergyman and bishop

- Church: Catholic
- Diocese: Chartres
- Appointed: 1710

Personal details
- Born: 2 February 1682 Paris
- Died: 10 May 1746 (aged 64)

Charles-François des Montiers de Mérinville (born 2 Feb 1682 in Paris – 10 May 1746) was a French clergyman and bishop for the Roman Catholic Diocese of Chartres. He became ordained in 1710. He was appointed bishop in 1710. He died on 10 May 1746, at the age of 64.
