= Solemnis (bishop) =

French Christian saint and bishop

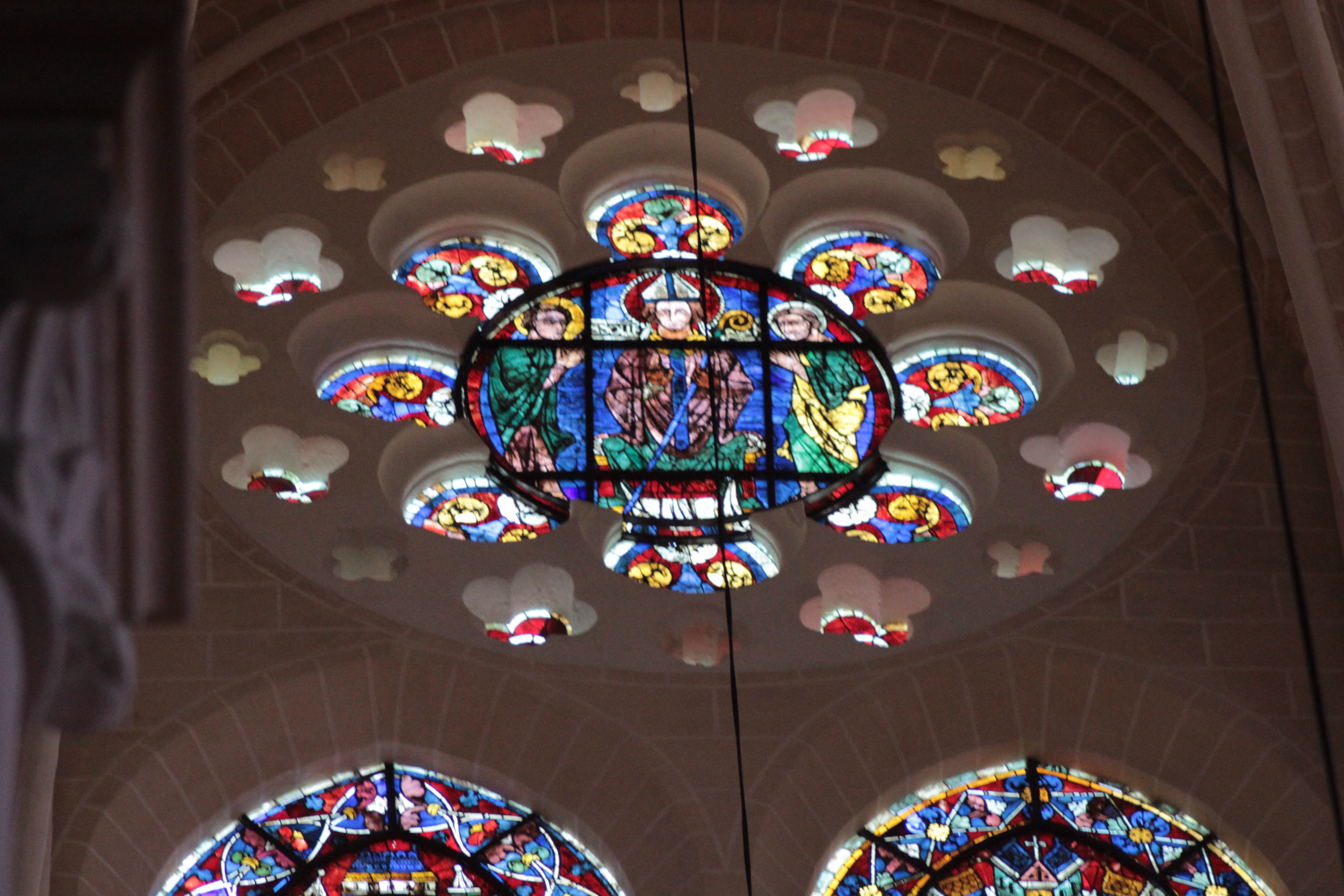
St. Solenne [Solemnis] of Chartres. Bay 138 of Chartres Cathedral.

Solemnis (French - Solène, Solen or Solenne; died c. 533) was a Christian saint and bishop. He appears in the Acta Sanctorum (Volume VII, 57) for 25 September.

He was made Bishop of Chartres in 483. He split off part of the bishopric of Chartres to create that of Châteaudun and made his brother Aventinus its first bishop. Solène, Vedast (bishop of Arras) and Remigius (bishop of Reims) all contributed to Clovis I's conversion to Christianity. Solène then assisted Remigius in Clovis's baptism in 499 and became the king's catechist. He died in Maillé (now known as Luynes, Indre-et-Loire département).
