= List of bishops of Chartres =

Bishops of Chatres

The oldest known list of bishops of Chartres is found in an 11th-century manuscript of Trinity Abbey, Vendôme. It includes 57 names from Adventus (Saint Aventin) to Aguiertus (Agobert) who died in 1060. The most well-known list is included in the Vieille Chronique of Chartres (1389).

== To 1000 ==
- Saint Aventus (Adventinus)
- Optatus
- Valentinus c. 395
- Martin le Blanc (Martinus Candidus)
- Aignan
- Severe
- Castor
- Africanus (?)
- Possesseur (Possessor)
- Polychronius
- Palladius (?)
- Arbogast
- Flavius (?)
- Saint Solen or Solenne (Solemnis) 483-507
- c. 511 Saint Aventin
- ?–552 Etherius, also Euthere (Etherus)
- Leobinus, 544-557
- ?–567 Calétric of Chartres
- Pappolus (Papulus, Pabulus)
- Boetharius or Bohaire, Betharius, Béthaire de Chartres c.594-?
- Magnobode or Magobertus, Magnebodus, Mugoldus (?)
- Sigoald
- Mainulf
- Thibaut
- Lancegesile or Bertegisilus (Leodegisilus, Lancissilus, Langesilisus, Bertegisilus)
- c. 640–658?: Saint Malard
- Gaubert or Gausbert (Gaubertus, Gausbertus)
- Deodat (?)
- Dromus, Dronus, Drono, Pronus, Promus, Promo (?)
- Berthegran (?)
- Haynius (?)
- Agirard or Airard (Agirardus, Aidradus, Airardus, Aicardus, Haigradus)
- Agatheus (?)
- Leobert (Leobertus, Leudisbertus) c. 723
- Hado (?)
- Flavius (?)
- Godessald (?) also Godosaldus, Godalsadus
- Bernoin (Bernoinus, Hernoinus, Hieronymus)
- Helie ca. 840 and 849
- c. 854: Bouchard (Burchardus)
- Frotbold 855–857
- Gislebert or Gilbert (Gislebertus, Willebertus, Galeverius, Galtherus) 859 and 878
- Aymon (?)
- Gerard or Girard (?)
- Aymeric or Aymery
- Gancelme or Goussaume (Waltelmus, Wantelmus, Waltelmus, Gancelinus, Gantelmus, Ancelmus, Gancelmus...)
- Aganon or Haganon ca. 931 and 940
- Rainfroy ca. 949–950
- Hardouin
- Vulfaldus or Ulphardus
- c. 984: Eudes (Odo)

== 1000 to 1300 ==
- 1007–1028: Fulbert of Chartres
- 1028–1048: Thierry (Theodoricus)
- 1048–1060: Agobert (Agobertus, Agenertus, Aivertus, Adevertus)
- 1060–1064/1065: Hugo
- 1065–1069: Robert de Tours
- 1069–1075: Arrald
- 1075–1076: Robert de Grantemesnil
- 1077–1089: Geoffroy I.
- 1089–1115: Ivo of Chartres
- 1115–ca. 1148: Geoffroy II. de Lèves
- 1148–1155: Gosselin de Lèves
- 1155–1164: Robert
- 1164–1176: William of the White Hands (House of Blois)
- 1176–1180: John of Salisbury
- 1181–1183: Pierre de Celle
- 1182–1217: Renaud de Bar (or de Mousson)
- 1218–1234: Gautier
- 1234–1236: Hugues de La Ferté
- 1236–1244: Aubry Cornut
- 1244–1246: Henri de Grez (de Gressibus)
- 1247–1259: Mathieu des Champs (de Campis)
- 1259–1276: Pierre de Mincy
- 1277–1297: Simon de Perruchay
- 1298–1315: Jean de Garlande

== 1300 to 1500 ==
- 1316–1326: Robert de Joigny
- 1326–1328: Pierre de Chappes
- 1328–1332: Jean du Plessis-Pasté
- 1332–1342: Aymery de Chastellux
- ????–????: Guillaume Amy (Amici) (also bishop of Apt)
- ????–1357: Louis de Vaucemain
- 1357–1360: Simon Lemaire (also bishop of Dol)
- 1360–????: Jean d'Anguerant
- Guillaume de Chanac
- ????–????: Guérin d'Arcy
- ????–1390: Jean Lefèvre
- 1391–1406: Jean de Montaigu
- ????–1415: Martin Gouge de Charpaigne
- 1415–1418: Philippe de Boisgilon
- ????–1432: Jean de Frétigny
- 1432–1434: Robert Dauphin
- ????–1441: Thibaut Lemoine
- 1442–1443: Pierre de Comborn
- 1444–1459: Pierre Bèchebien
- 1459–1492: Miles d'Illiers
- 1492–1507: René d'Illiers

== 1500 to 1800 ==
- 1507–1525: Érard de la Marck
- 1525–1553: Louis Guillard (previously bishop of Tournai)
- 1553–1573: Charles Guillard
- 1573–1598: Nicolas de Thou
- 1599–1620: Philippe Hurault de Cheverny
- 1620–1642: Léonore d'Étampes de Valençay (also archbishop of Reims)
- 1642–1656: Jacques Lescot
- 1657–1690: Ferdinand de Neuville de Villeroy (previously bishop of Saint-Malo)
- 1690–1709: Paul Godet des Marais
- 1710–1746: Charles-François des Montiers de Mérinville
- 1748–1780: Pierre-Augustin-Bernardin de Rosset de Fleury
- 1780–1790: Jean-Baptiste-Joseph de Lubersac
- 1791–1793: Nicolas Bonnet, a constitutional bishop
- In 1793, the Cathedral of Chartres was converted to a Temple of Reason. The Diocese was reestablished at the Concordat of 11 June 1817, although a new bishop was not appointed until 1821.

== From 1800 ==
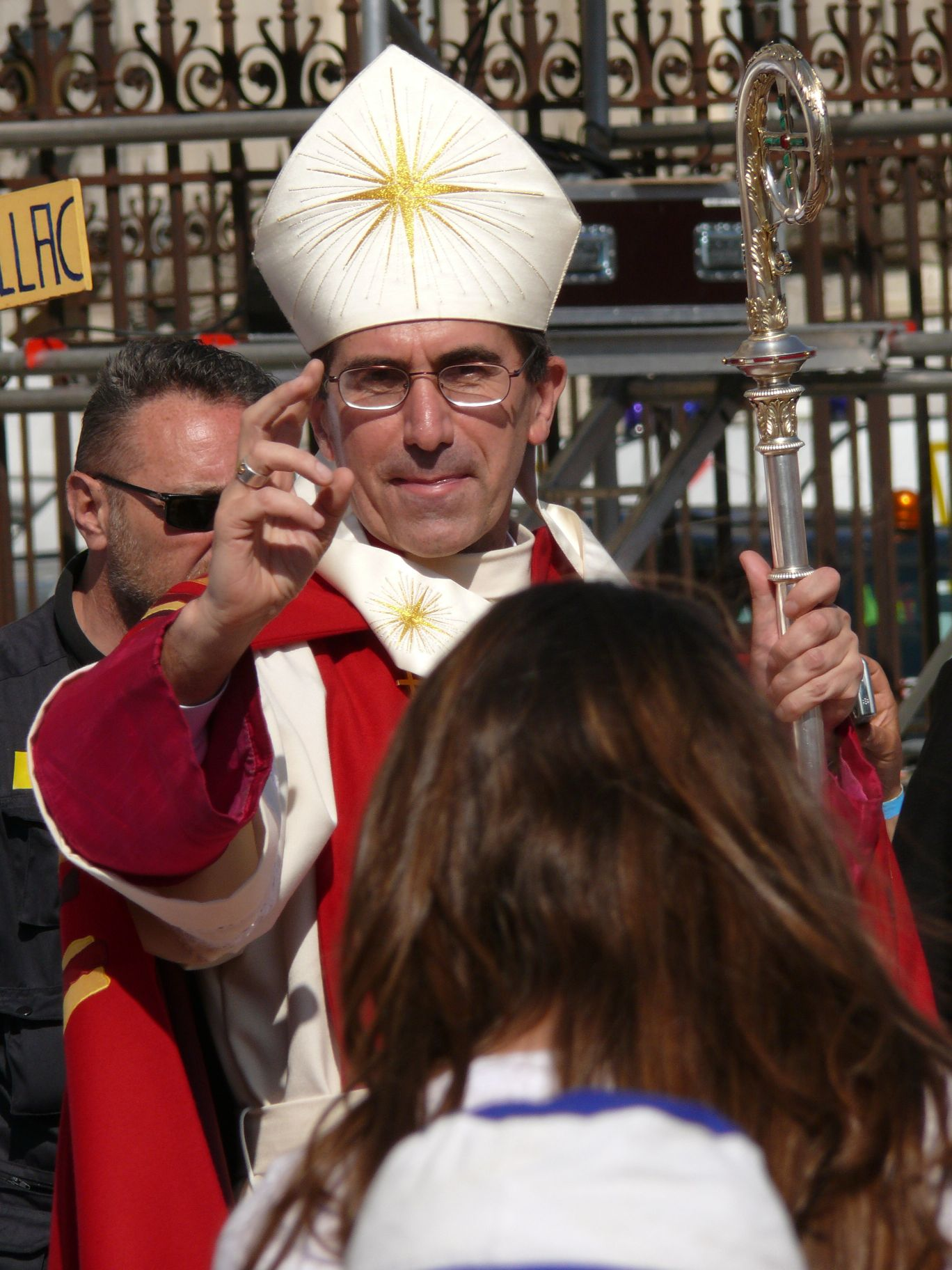
Bishop Michel Pansard

- Jean-Baptist-Marie-Anne-Antoine de Latil (1817–1824) (also Archbishop of Reims)
- Claude-Hippolyte Clausel de Montals (1824–1853)
- Louis-Eugène Regnault (1853–1889)
- François Lagrange (1889–1895)
- Bon-Arthur-Gabriel Mollien (1896–1904)
- Henri-Louis-Alfred Bouquet (1906–1926)
- Raoul-Octove-Marie-Jean Harscouët (1926–1954)
- Roger Michon (1955–1978)
- Michel Joseph Kuehn (1978–1991)
- Jacques Jean Joseph Jules Perrier (1991–1997) (also coadjutor bishop of Tarbes and Lourdes)
- Bernard-Nicolas Aubertin, O. Cist. (1998–2005) (then Archbishop of Tours)
- Michel Pansard (2005–2018)
- Philippe Christory (2018-present)
