= Deaths in September 2012 =

The following is a list of notable deaths in September 2012.

Entries for each day are listed alphabetically by surname. A typical entry lists information in the following sequence:

- Name, age, country of citizenship and reason for notability, established cause of death, reference.

== September 2012 ==
=== 1 ===
- Joseph Banchong Aribarg, 85, Thai Roman Catholic prelate, Bishop of Nakhon Sawan (1976–1998).
- Sean Bergin, 64, South African jazz musician.
- Lina Canalejas, 80, Spanish actress, cancer.
- Françoise Collin, 84, Belgian novelist.
- Badal Das, 47, Bangladeshi footballer, cardiac arrest.
- Hal David, 91, American lyricist ("Raindrops Keep Fallin' on My Head"), complications from a stroke.
- Sat Mahajan, 85, Indian politician, MLA in Himachal Pradesh (1977–1996, 2003–2007) and MP for Kangra (1996–1998), cardiac arrest.
- Smarck Michel, 75, Haitian businessman and politician, Prime Minister (1994–1995), brain tumor.
- David R. Morrison, 71, Scottish writer and painter.
- William Petzäll, 24, Swedish politician, MP for Dalarna County (since 2010), suspected drug overdose.
- Dmitri Plavinsky, 75, Russian artist.
- Arnaldo Putzu, 85, Italian film poster artist.
- Rainbows For Life, 24, Canadian Thoroughbred racehorse, winner of the 1990 Summer Stakes, Cup and Saucer Stakes and Coronation Futurity Stakes, euthanized.
- Sy Schulman, 86, American civil engineer and politician, Mayor of White Plains, New York (1993–1997), cancer.
- Jon Tolaas, 73, Norwegian poet and novelist.

=== 2 ===
- Yugo Araki, 87, Japanese Olympic equestrian.
- Adolf Bierbrauer, 97, German artist, painter and sculptor.
- Anil Bordia, 78, Indian educationist, social activist and civil servant, cardiac arrest.
- Jack Boucher, 80, American photographer (Historic American Buildings Survey), heart disease.
- Peter Wilson Coldham, 85, British genealogist.
- Bob Johnstone, 82, Canadian broadcaster (CBC Radio), cancer.
- John C. Marshall, 71, British musician.
- Emmanuel Nunes, 71, Portuguese composer.
- Blas Riquelme, 83, Paraguayan politician and businessman.
- Len Stephan, 77, Australian politician, member of the Queensland Legislative Assembly (1979–2001).
- Bert Worner, 82, Australian football player (Geelong).

=== 3 ===
- Ralph Angelo Bernardi, 83, Australian mayor and businessman.
- Griselda Blanco, 69, Colombian-born American drug lord, shooting.
- Edward Boccia, 91, American painter and poet.
- Sir Andrew Crockett, 69, British banker.
- Bira Kesari Deo, 85, Indian politician.
- Bob DiPietro, 85, American baseball player (Boston Red Sox), cancer.
- Harold Dunaway, 78, American stock car driver.
- Michael Clarke Duncan, 54, American actor (The Green Mile, Armageddon, Daredevil), heart attack.
- Ottó Foky, 85, Hungarian animator.
- Hyatt M. Gibbs, 74, American physicist.
- Sun Myung Moon, 92, South Korean religious figure, founder of the Unification Church and The Washington Times, pneumonia.
- Tito Oreta, 73, Filipino politician, Mayor of Malabon (since 2004), lung cancer.
- Charlie Rose, 73, American politician, U.S. Representative from North Carolina (1973–1997), Parkinson's disease.
- Ola Vincent, 87, Nigerian economist and banker, Governor of the Central Bank of Nigeria (1977–1982).

=== 4 ===
- Hamzah Abu Samah, 88, Malaysian politician and sports administrator, MP for Raub (1967–1978) and Temerloh (1978–1980), President of AFC (1978–1994).
- José Santos Arias, 84, Chilean football player.
- Avraham Avigdorov, 83, Israeli soldier, Hero of Israel recipient.
- Siân Busby, 51, British writer, lung cancer.
- Leila Danette, 103, American actress.
- Arleen Day, 63, Canadian curler.
- André Delelis, 88, French politician, MP for Pas-de-Calais (1983–1992).
- William Engvick, 98, American lyricist.
- Hélio Gonçalves Heleno, 77, Brazilian Roman Catholic prelate, Bishop of Caratinga (1979–2011).
- Albert Marre, 87, American stage actor, director and producer, widower of soprano Joan Diener, following a long illness.
- Ian Parrott, 96, British composer and academic.
- George Savitsky, 88, American football player (Philadelphia Eagles), complications from pneumonia.
- Sigrid Schjetne, 16, Norwegian homicide victim. (body found on this date)
- Syed Mustafa Siraj, 82, Indian writer.
- Milan Vukelić, 76, Serbian football player.

=== 5 ===
- Mirella Avalle, 90, Italian sprinter.
- Ediz Bahtiyaroğlu, 26, Turkish footballer (Eskişehirspor), heart attack.
- Dorothy Caley, 92, Canadian figure skater.
- Eric Deeral, 79, Australian politician, Queensland MLA for Cook (1974–1977), first Aboriginal member of the Queensland Parliament.
- Ian Dick, 86, Australian cricketer and field hockey player.
- Vasily Dyakonov, 66, Russian politician, Governor of Krasnodar Krai (1991–1992).
- Martin Filchock, 100, American cartoonist and artist.
- Robert Morgan Fink, 96, American biochemist.
- Victoria Fyodorova, 66, Russian film actress.
- Christian Marin, 83, French film actor (Le Gendarme de Saint-Tropez, Gendarme in New York).
- John Lawrence, 2nd Baron Oaksey, 83, British peer and horse racing journalist.
- Tapio Säynevirta, 47, Finnish Olympic sports shooter.
- Joe South, 72, American singer-songwriter ("Down in the Boondocks", "Hush", "Rose Garden"), heart failure.
- Gord Strate, 77, Canadian ice hockey player (Detroit Red Wings).

=== 6 ===
- Ed Barker, 81, American football player (Pittsburgh Penguins, Washington Redskins).
- Elisabeth Böhm, 91, German architect.
- Susan Clark, 48, American sailor, cancer.
- Lawrie Dring, 81, British Scouter, President of the Baden-Powell Scouts' Association.
- Jake Eberts, 71, Canadian film producer (City of Joy, Super Mario Bros., Grey Owl), executive and financier, cancer.
- Frank Godwin, 95, British film producer (Woman in a Dressing Gown).
- Jerome Horwitz, 93, American scientist.
- Jerome Kilty, 90, American actor and playwright.
- Alan Kimber, 63, English swimmer, cancer.
- Maram, 6, American Thoroughbred racehorse, winner of the Breeders' Cup Juvenile Fillies Turf (2008), euthanized.
- Art Modell, 87, American businessman, owner of the Baltimore Ravens (1996–2004), heart failure.
- Bertil Norström, 88, Swedish actor.
- Terry Nutkins, 66, British TV presenter and naturalist, leukaemia.
- Oscar Rossi, 82, Argentine football player.
- Herbert O. Sparrow, 82, Canadian politician, Senator for Saskatchewan (1968–2005).
- Horacio Vázquez-Rial, 65, Argentine-born Spanish writer, cancer.
- Roger Wotton, 92, Australian politician, member of the New South Wales Legislative Assembly (1968–1971, 1973–1991).

=== 7 ===
- Rudi M. Brewster, 80, American judge.
- Richard Bucher, 56, Swiss Olympic ice hockey player, heart attack.
- C. Edwin Creed, 91, American football coach.
- Gerry Culliton, 76, Irish rugby player.
- Leszek Drogosz, 79, Polish Olympic bronze medal-winning (1960) boxer, cancer.
- César Fernández Ardavín, 89, Spanish film director (El Lazarillo de Tormes).
- Abdul Ghafoor, 70, Pakistani footballer.
- Bob Lambert, 55, American entertainment industry executive (The Walt Disney Company).
- Louise LaPlanche, 93, American actress.
- Aleksandr Maksimenkov, 60, Russian football coach and player.
- Dorothy McGuire, 84, American singer, complications of Parkinson's disease.
- Alphonse Nzoungou, 74, Congolese politician.
- Maestro Reverendo, 57, Spanish musician and composer, cancer.
- Nicole Russell, Duchess of Bedford, 92, French-born British television producer and socialite.
- Rollin Sullivan, 93, American country music entertainer (Lonzo and Oscar).
- Daniel Weinreb, 53, American computer scientist and programmer, cancer.

=== 8 ===
- Adnan Farhan Abd Al Latif, 30–31, Yemeni detainee (Guantánamo Bay).
- María Elvia Amaya Araujo, 58, Mexican psychologist, philanthropist, and politician, multiple myeloma.
- Xavier-Marie Baronnet, 85, French-born Seychellois Roman Catholic prelate, Bishop of Port Victoria o Seychelles (1995–2002).
- Adolf Bechtold, 86, German footballer (Eintracht Frankfurt).
- Aleksandr Belyavsky, 80, Russian actor.
- Brian Crossley, 85, English-born Australian actor (Adventure Island) and director.
- Luís d'Andrea, 78, Brazilian Roman Catholic bishop.
- Bob Hale, 78, American baseball player (Baltimore Orioles, Cleveland Indians, New York Yankees).
- Leigh Hamilton, 62, New Zealand-born American actress (Forced Vengeance, Gas Food Lodging, Hocus Pocus).
- Ronald Hamowy, 75, American historian.
- Peter Hussing, 64, German Olympic bronze medallist boxer (1972).
- André Kempinaire, 83, Belgian politician.
- Bill Moggridge, 69, British industrial designer, cancer.
- Mārtiņš Roze, 47, Latvian politician, Minister of Agriculture (2002–2009), blood clot.
- Allyre Sirois, 89, Canadian jurist.
- Thomas Szasz, 92, Hungarian-born American psychiatrist.
- Elizabeth Wood-Ellem, 81, Tongan historian.
- Ocak Işık Yurtçu, 67, Turkish journalist.
- Mario Armond Zamparelli, 91, American design artist and painter, husband of Maureen Hingert.

=== 9 ===
- Nabil Abou Alqama, 34–35, Algerian jihadist, car accident.
- Hugh Bentall, 92, British pioneer surgeon.
- Donna Bruton, 58, American painter.
- Günter Discher, 87, German musician.
- Larry Gibson, 66, American environmentalist, heart attack.
- Rudolf Kleiner, 88, Swiss Olympic speed skater.
- Verghese Kurien, 90, Indian engineer and businessman, kidney failure.
- Désiré Letort, 69, French cyclist.
- John McCarthy, 22, Australian AFL footballer (Port Adelaide), fall from a building.
- Monsun, 22, German Thoroughbred racehorse, winner of the Aral-Pokal (1993) and Preis von Europa (1993, 1994), euthanized.
- José Rodrigues de Souza, 86, Brazilian Roman Catholic prelate, Bishop of Juazeiro (1975–2003).
- Mike Scarry, 92, American football player and coach.
- Ron Taylor, 78, Australian marine conservationist, myeloid leukemia.
- Ron Tindall, 76, English footballer (Chelsea).

=== 10 ===
- Muslehuddin Ahmad, 80, Bangladeshi diplomat and university administrator, consequences of stroke.
- Pawana Chanajit, 69, Thai actress, drowning.
- Raquel Correa, 78, Chilean journalist, cerebral damage followed by heart failure.
- Sam Dansie, 85, Australian forester and botanist.
- Vondell Darr, 93, American actress.
- György Enyedi, 82, Hungarian geographer.
- Robert Gammage, 74, American jurist and politician, member of the House of Representatives (1977–1979), heart attack.
- Lance LeGault, 77, American actor (The A-Team, Magnum, P.I., Home on the Range), heart failure.
- Stanley Long, 78, British cinematographer and film director, natural causes.
- Tadahiro Matsushita, 73, Japanese politician, member of the House of Representatives (1993–2005, since 2007).
- Robert B. McKeon, 58, American businessman and philanthropist, suicide.
- John Moffatt, 89, English actor and playwright.
- Ernesto de la Peña, 84, Mexican writer.
- Tom Saffell, 91, American baseball player (Pittsburgh Pirates) and executive, President of Gulf Coast League (1979–2009), pneumonia.
- Steven Springer, 60, American guitarist and songwriter, lung cancer.
- Hans Joachim Störig, 97, German non-fiction author, translator and publisher.
- James Wellbeloved, 86, British politician, MP for Erith and Crayford (1965–1983).
- Edwin P. Wilson, 84, American CIA and U.S. Naval Intelligence officer, complications of surgery.

=== 11 ===
- Zia Ahmed, 58, Bangladeshi Army officer.
- Rolf Bjørn Backe, 78, Norwegian footballer.
- Bruce Bolling, 67, American politician, prostate cancer.
- Finn Bergesen, 67, Norwegian business executive and lawyer, cancer.
- Tibor Csernai, 73, Hungarian Olympic champion footballer (1964).
- Erwin Dold, 92, German pilot.
- Rein Etruk, 74, Estonian chess player.
- Tomas Evjen, 39, Norwegian film producer (Dead Snow).
- Tony Goldman, 68, American real estate developer, art impresario and preservationist (SoHo, Miami Beach Architectural District).
- Maurice Keen, 78, British historian.
- Sergio Livingstone, 92, Chilean footballer and sports commentator.
- Charles Pidjot, 50, New Caledonian politician, President of the Caledonian Union.
- Irving S. Reed, 88, American mathematician and engineer.
- Manuel Salvat Dalmau, 86, Spanish publisher.
- Sean Smith, 34, American diplomat serving in Libya, injuries sustained during U.S. Consulate attack in Benghazi.
- Bruce Von Hoff, 68, American baseball player (Houston Astros).

=== 12 ===
- Jimmy Andrews, 85, Scottish footballer.
- Siarhei Artsiukhin, 35, Russian wrestler, European Greco-Roman wrestling champion, heart attack.
- Radoslav Brzobohatý, 79, Czech actor, stroke.
- Charles Kennedy Comans, 97, Australian lawyer, First Parliamentary Counsel of the Commonwealth (1972–1977).
- Eugene Cota-Robles, 86, American biologist.
- Shaun Cummins, 44, British boxer, murdered (body found on that day).
- Glen Doherty, 42, American company employee, mortar attack.
- Arkadii Dragomoshchenko, 66, Russian poet.
- Jon Finlayson, 74, Australian actor (Zoo Family), cancer.
- Alfred Henningsen, 94, Norwegian military officer and politician.
- Geoffrey Horrocks, 79, British mathematician.
- Derek Jameson, 82, British journalist and broadcaster, heart attack.
- Michael Lee, 76, Zimbabwean cricketer.
- Keith Lewis, 89, Australian cricketer.
- Janet Liang, 25, American health advocate, lymphoblastic leukemia.
- Rafał Piszcz, 71, Polish Olympic bronze medal-winning (1972) sprint canoer.
- Audrie Pott, 15, American cyberbullying victim, suicide by hanging.
- William Schatzkamer, 96, American pianist and conductor.
- Tom Sims, 62, American skate and snowboarder, founder of Sims Snowboards, cardiac arrest.
- J. Christopher Stevens, 52, American diplomat, U.S. Ambassador to Libya (2012), smoke inhalation during U.S. Consulate attack in Benghazi.
- Sid Watkins, 84, British neurosurgeon, Formula One safety and medical delegate.
- Whobegotyou, 7, Australian Thoroughbred racehorse.

=== 13 ===
- Jean-Claude Abric, 70, French psychologist.
- Obo Addy, 76, Ghanaian drummer, National Heritage Fellowship recipient (1996), liver cancer.
- Michel Baud, 48, French Egyptologist, suicide.
- Aditya Dev, 23, Indian bodybuilder, ruptured brain aneurysm.
- John E. Dohms, 65, American microbiologist. (disappeared on this date)
- William Duckworth, 69, American composer, pancreatic cancer.
- Griffith Edwards, 83, Indian-born British psychiatrist and addiction specialist.
- Dilhan Eryurt, 85, Turkish astrophysicist, heart attack.
- Robyn Few, 53, American sex worker rights activist (Sex Workers Outreach Project USA), cancer.
- Tomlinson Fort Jr., 80, American chemist.
- Pedro E. Guerrero, 95, American photographer, cancer.
- Leopold Koss, 92, American pathologist.
- Lehri, 83, Pakistani actor and comedian, complications from diabetes.
- Peter Lougheed, 84, Canadian politician, Premier of Alberta (1971–1985); MLA for Calgary-West (1967–1986), natural causes.
- Brian Óg Maguire, 24, Irish Gaelic football player, industrial accident.
- Mary Rose McGeady, 84, American Roman Catholic nun.
- Edgar Metcalfe, 78, English actor, director and writer, liver cancer.
- Ranganath Misra, 85, Indian jurist, Chief Justice (1990–1991), neurological disorder.
- Jack Pierce, 64, American baseball player (Atlanta Braves, Detroit Tigers), heart attack.
- Otto Stich, 85, Swiss politician, President of the Confederation (1988, 1994).
- John Turner, 63, English cricketer.

=== 14 ===
- Angelo Amodeo, 80, Italian priest.
- Jacques Antoine, 88, French game show writer, creator of Fort Boyard and The Crystal Maze, cardiac arrest.
- Pinkie Barnes, 97, English table tennis player.
- Don Binney, 72, New Zealand painter, cardiac arrest.
- Jaylee Burley Mead, 83, American astronomer.
- Eduardo Castro Luque, 48, Mexican politician, shooting.
- Dame Joy Drayton, 96, New Zealand academic, educator and politician.
- Frank Dudley, 87, English footballer.
- Stephen Dunham, 48, American actor (The Mummy, What I Like About You, Monster-in-Law), heart attack.
- Gérard Ghidini, 69, French slalom canoeist.
- Sir Yuet-Keung Kan, 99, Hong Kong banker, politician, and lawyer, senior unofficial member of the Executive Council (1974–1980).
- Michel Leduc, 71, Canadian politician, last mayor of LaSalle, Quebec, Canada (1983–2001) before amalgamation, cancer.
- Winston Rekert, 63, Canadian actor (Neon Rider, Battlestar Galactica), cancer.
- Louis Simpson, 89, American poet, Alzheimer's disease.
- András Szente, 72, Hungarian sprint canoer, Olympic dual silver medalist (1960).

=== 15 ===
- Ashimjan Akhmetov, 62, Kazakh scientist and politician.
- Tibor Antalpéter, 82, Hungarian volleyball player and diplomat, Ambassador to the United Kingdom (1990–1995).
- Fred Bodsworth, 93, Canadian writer.
- Predrag Brzaković, 47, Serbian footballer, heart attack.
- Carlos Calderón, 77, Mexican football player.
- Pilar Coll, 83, Spanish activist, missionary and lawyer.
- James "Sugar Boy" Crawford, 77, American rhythm and blues singer.
- Olga Ferri, 83, Argentine ballet dancer.
- Jean-Louis Heinrich, 69, French footballer.
- George Hurst, 86, British conductor.
- Arthur Magugu, 78, Kenyan politician, Minister for Finance (1982–1988), MP for Githunguri (1969–1988, 2002–2007).
- Pierre Mondy, 87, French actor (Now Where Did the 7th Company Get to?) and director (La Cage aux Folles), lymphoma.
- Paul Okesene, 44, Samoan rugby league player, heart attack.
- Stephen Paul, 58, American physicist.
- Max Soriano, 86, American baseball team co-owner (Seattle Pilots).
- Nevin Spence, 22, Irish rugby union player (Ulster), slurry tank gas poisoning.
- K. S. Sudarshan, 81, Indian nationalist, Sarsanghchalak of the RSS (2000–2009), heart attack.

=== 16 ===
- John Coates, 84, British animated film producer (The Snowman), cancer.
- Charles E. Collins, 83, American politician and activist.
- Dana Deshler, 75, American politician.
- John Ingle, 84, American actor (Death Becomes Her, General Hospital, Batman & Robin), cancer.
- Roman Kroitor, 85, Canadian filmmaker.
- Julien J. LeBourgeois, 88, American vice admiral, heart and kidney ailments.
- Loose Mohan, 84, Indian actor, respiratory issues.
- Shinichi Nishimiya, 60, Japanese diplomat, Ambassador-designate to China (2012), acute heart failure.
- Princess Ragnhild, Mrs. Lorentzen, 82, Norwegian royal, eldest child of King Olav V.
- Jaime Serrano Cedillo, 45, Mexican politician, stabbing.
- Muhammadjon Shakuri, 87, Tajik academic, cancer.
- Suthivelu, 65, Indian film actor and comedian, cardiac arrest.
- Friedrich Zimmermann, 87, German politician, Minister of the Interior (1982–1989); Minister of Transport (1989–1991).

=== 17 ===
- Bafo Biyela, 31, South African footballer, after short illness.
- William S. Calli, 88, American lawyer and politician.
- Bujar Çani, 65, Albanian footballer.
- Melvin Charney, 77, Canadian artist and architect.
- Alan Cleveley, 88, English cricketer.
- Prem Ram Dubey, 78, Indian activist, after prolonged illness.
- Esther Gamlielit, 93, Israeli singer.
- Pauline Hill, 86, American AAGPBL baseball player.
- Lou Kenton, 104, English potter and Spanish Civil War veteran.
- Édouard Leclerc, 85, French businessman, founder of E.Leclerc supermarket chain.
- Nikodimos of Ierissos, 81, Greek Orthodox prelate, Bishop of Ierissos (since 1981).
- Tridev Roy, 79, Bangladeshi-born Pakistani politician, Buddhist leader and Chakma raja (1953–1971), Ambassador to Argentina (1981–1996).
- Tedi Thurman, 89, American fashion model and actress.
- Russell E. Train, 92, American civil servant, Administrator of the EPA (1973–1977) and President of the WWF (1978–1985).
- Ferenc Polikárp Zakar, 82, Hungarian Cistercian monk, Archabbot of the Zirc Abbey (1996–2010).

=== 18 ===
- Santiago Carrillo, 97, Spanish politician, veteran of the Spanish Civil War.
- Wantha Davis, 95, American female jockey and pioneer in thoroughbred horse racing.
- Peter Demos, 94, Canadian physicist.
- Deputed Testamony, 32, American Thoroughbred racehorse.
- Leo Goeke, 74, American opera singer, complications of strokes.
- Luís Goes, 79, Portuguese singer.
- Haim Hefer, 86, Israeli songwriter, poet, and writer.
- Michael Hurll, 75, British television producer, Parkinson's disease.
- Jim Jordan, 84, Canadian politician, MP for Leeds—Grenville (1988–1997), cancer.
- Betty Kaunda, 84, Zambian First Lady (1964–1991), wife of Kenneth Kaunda.
- Jack Kralick, 77, American baseball player (Washington Senators/Minnesota Twins), complications from strokes.
- Michel Joseph Kuehn, 89, French Roman Catholic prelate, Bishop of Chartres (1978–1991).
- Jorge Manicera, 73, Uruguayan footballer.
- Ralph Marshall, 85, Bermudian politician, MP for Southampton West (1963–1993), pneumonia.
- Steve Sabol, 69, American filmmaker, co-founder of NFL Films, brain cancer.
- Rubini, 78, Mexican footballer.
- Brian Woolnough, 63, British sports journalist, cancer.
- Wu Shaozu, 73, Chinese major general and politician, Chairperson of the Chinese Olympic Committee (1995–1999).

=== 19 ===
- Paul Adderley, 84, Bahamian politician and lawyer.
- Behnam Abu Alsoof, 80, Iraqi archaeologist, anthropologist, historian and writer, heart attack.
- Víctor Cabedo, 23, Spanish racing cyclist, road accident.
- Chief Bearhart, 19, Canadian Thoroughbred racehorse, winner of the 1997 Canadian International Stakes and Breeders' Cup Turf, heart failure.
- Patrick Creagh, 81, British poet and translator.
- Rino Ferrario, 85, Italian footballer.
- Earl R. Fox, 93, U.S. Navy and Coast Guard veteran.
- Leopoldo Penna Franca, 53, Brazilian mathematician, heart attack.
- Cecil Gordon, 71, American NASCAR driver and team owner, cancer.
- Marty Kinerk, 72, American racing driver, illness.
- Bettye Lane, 82, American photojournalist, cancer.
- Leonard Lerman, 87, American geneticist, complications of a chronic neurological disease.
- Elizabeth Percy, Duchess of Northumberland, 90, British peeress, widow of the 10th Duke of Northumberland.
- Itamar Singer, 66, Romanian-born Israeli Hittitologist.

=== 20 ===
- Fortunato Baldelli, 77, Italian Roman Catholic cardinal, Major Penitentiary of the Apostolic Penitentiary (2009–2012).
- Robert G. Barrett, 69, Australian author (Les Norton series), cancer.
- Richard H. Cracroft, 76, American academic.
- Gianfranco Dell'Innocenti, 86, Italian footballer.
- Anatoli Fedorov, 76, Soviet and Russian rower and rowing coach.
- Alan Neville Gent, 84, English scientist.
- Robert Wayne Harris, 40, American mass murderer, execution by lethal injection.
- Ulla Lock, 78, Danish film actress.
- Tom McCormick, 82, American football player.
- Paul O'Connor, 49, Irish hurler (Cork).
- Michel Pech, 66, French football player (FC Nantes), cancer.
- Paul Pojman, 45, American philosopher, cancer.
- Herbert Rosendorfer, 78, German writer.
- Robert Sharer, 72, American Mayanist.
- Bhupendra Silwal, 76, Nepalese Olympic runner.
- Dinesh Thakur, 65, Indian theatre director and actor (Rajnigandha), kidney ailments.
- Tereska Torrès, 92, French writer.
- Dorothy Wedderburn, 87, British academic.

=== 21 ===
- Pedro de Almeida, 73, Portuguese Olympic athlete.
- Mike Baker, 55, British journalist (BBC, The Guardian), lung cancer.
- Konda Laxman Bapuji, 96, Indian politician and freedom fighter.
- Henry Bauchau, 99, Belgian psychoanalyst and author.
- Max C. Brewer, 88, Canadian scientist.
- Ed Conlin, 79, American basketball player (Syracuse Nationals, Philadelphia Warriors, Detroit Pistons).
- José Curbelo, 95, Cuban-born American jazz musician and manager, heart failure.
- Mary DeMelim, 82, American academic administrator.
- Yehuda Elkana, 78, Israeli historian and philosopher, President and Rector of the Central European University (1999–2009), cancer.
- Gideon Gadot, 71, Israeli journalist and politician, member of the Knesset (1984–1992).
- Sven Hassel, 95, Danish-born German soldier and author.
- Karl-Gustav Kaisla, 68, Finnish ice hockey referee (Miracle on Ice).
- Gopalan Kasturi, 87, Indian newspaper editor (The Hindu).
- Bill King, 102, British naval officer, yachtsman, and author.
- Michael Rye, 94, American voice actor (Disney's Adventures of the Gummi Bears, Super Friends).
- Bruno Schettino, 71, Italian Roman Catholic prelate, Archbishop of Capua (since 1997).
- Mike Sparken, 82, French racing driver, cancer.
- Tom Umphlett, 81, American baseball player (Boston Red Sox, Washington Senators)
- Len Weare, 78, Welsh footballer (Newport County).
- Sir John Woodcock, 80, British police officer, Chief Inspector of Constabulary (1990–1993).

=== 22 ===
- Hector Abhayavardhana, 93, Sri Lankan political theorist.
- Irving Adler, 99, American author, mathematician, and scientist.
- Anna-Lisa Augustsson, 87, Swedish sprinter.
- Rolf Bercht, 87, Brazilian Olympic sailor.
- Brandon Brown, 26, American football player, injuries sustained during beating.
- Michel Caldaguès, 85, French politician.
- Nim Campbell, 82, Scottish rugby union player.
- Juan H. Cintrón García, 93, Puerto Rican politician.
- Nicholas T. Clerk, 82, Ghanaian academic, natural causes.
- Robert Davidson, 85, Scottish theologian.
- Trevor Davies, 83–84, British basketball player.
- Grigory Frid, 97, Russian composer, artist and writer.
- Lewis McGibbon, 80, English cricketer (Northamptonshire).
- Mustaf Haji Mohamed, Somali politician and MP, shooting.
- Harry Pilling, 69, British cricketer (Lancashire).
- Jan Hendrik van den Berg, 98, Dutch psychiatrist.

=== 23 ===
- Caroline Iverson Ackerman, 94, American aviator, journalist, reporter and educator.
- Reubin Andres, 89, American gerontologist.
- Ashwini, 45, Indian actress, liver illness.
- Bodo Bittner, 72, German Olympic bronze medallist bobsledder (1976).
- Henry Champ, 75, Canadian journalist (Canadian Broadcasting Corporation), lung cancer.
- Molly Clark, 89, Australian pastoral and tourism pioneer.
- Bennie L. Davis, 94, American general (Strategic Air Command, 1981–1985).
- Ralf Drecoll, 67, German Olympic high jumper.
- Maria Pia Gardini, 75, Italian entrepreneur.
- Martí Gasull i Roig, 43, Spanish Catalan linguistic activist and a mountaineer, avalanche.
- Alberto González, 84, Cuban humorist and iconoclast.
- Pavel Grachev, 64, Russian general, Minister of Defence (1992–1996), acute meningoencephalitis.
- K Lal, 88, Indian magician, brain cancer.
- Winrich Kolbe, 71, German-born American television director (Star Trek, Knight Rider, Angel). (death announced on this date)
- Sir Godfrey Milton-Thompson, 82, British naval surgeon.
- John O'Neill, 77, Irish footballer (Preston North End F.C.).
- Albert Henry Ottenweller, 96, American Roman Catholic prelate, Bishop of Steubenville (1977–1992).
- Mulraj Rajda, 80, Indian writer, actor and director.
- Roberto Rodríguez, 71, Venezuelan baseball player (Kansas City/Oakland Athletics, San Diego Padres, Chicago Cubs), heart attack.
- Michael Rowland, 83, British-born South African Roman Catholic prelate, Bishop of Dundee, South Africa (1983–2005).
- Corrie Sanders, 46, South African boxer, shooting.
- Sam Sniderman, 92, Canadian entrepreneur, founder of Sam the Record Man.
- Maths O. Sundqvist, 61, Swedish entrepreneur and business magnate, vehicle collision.
- Jean Taittinger, 89, French politician, Minister of Justice (1973–1974).
- Jason Winrow, 41, American football player (New York Giants).
- Radya Yeroshina, 82, Russian cross-country skier.

=== 24 ===
- Pierre Adam, 88, French Olympic gold medallist cyclist (1948).
- Abu Akash, Iraqi Al-Qaeda operative, drone strike.
- Edward A. Biery, 92, American film editor.
- Bruno Bobak, 88, Polish-born Canadian war artist, cancer.
- Annemarie Davidson, 91–92, German-born American artist.
- Sal Frederick, 86, American businessman and politician.
- Thilakan, 74, Indian Malayalam actor, heart attack.
- Pedro Vázquez Colmenares, 78, Mexican politician, Governor of Oaxaca (1980–1985).

=== 25 ===
- Gordon Ada, 89, Australian biochemist.
- Billy Barnes, 85, American composer and lyricist (The Billy Barnes Revue), complications from Alzheimer's disease.
- Mohamed Bah, 28, American police victim, shot.
- Wilfried Bode, 82, German Olympic water polo player.
- John Bond, 79, English football player and manager.
- Audrey Deemer, 81, American baseball player.
- Neşet Ertaş, 74, Turkish folk musician, cancer.
- Maurice Stanley Friedman, 90, American philosopher.
- Lorenzo Gamboa, 93, Filipino emigrant.
- André Giamarchi, 81, French footballer.
- Trevor Hardy, 67, British serial killer, heart attack.
- Eric Ives, 81, British historian.
- Dame Louise Johnson, 71, British biochemist and protein crystallographer.
- Patrick Kalilombe, 79, Malawian Roman Catholic prelate, Bishop of Lilongwe (1972–1979).
- Nigel Leathern, 80, South African cricketer.
- Alonso Lujambio, 50, Mexican politician, Secretary of Public Education (2009–2012), multiple myeloma.
- Alfredo Machado, 59, Brazilian Olympic swimmer.
- Jakub Polák, 60, Czech anarchist and Romani rights activist, cancer.
- Andy Williams, 84, American singer ("Moon River") and entertainer, bladder cancer.

=== 26 ===
- Edith Allard, 85, American ballerina.
- Pape Alioune Diop, Senegalese football player and manager (national team, 1982–1986), Alzheimer's disease.
- M'el Dowd, 79, American actress and singer (Camelot).
- Sylvia Fedoruk, 85, Canadian scientist, athlete, and politician, Lieutenant Governor of Saskatchewan (1988–1994), complications from a fall.
- Laura Fry, 45, British Olympic equestrian.
- Eugene Genovese, 82, American academic and author, cardiac ailment.
- Donald Gregg, 88, Australian cricketer.
- Vance Heafner, 58, American golfer and director (Prestonwood Country Club), suspected heart attack.
- Johnny Lewis, 28, American actor (Sons of Anarchy, The O.C., Drake & Josh), injuries from a fall.
- Maya Nasser, 33, Syrian journalist (Press TV), shooting.
- Tatsuo Nishida, 83, Japanese academic, heart attack.
- Florisvaldo de Oliveira, 53, Brazilian vigilante, serial killer and police officer, shot.
- Saeed Ahmed Raipuri, 86, Indian religious leader.
- Arturo Rodenak, 81, Argentine-born Chilean footballer, complications of diabetes.
- Sam Steiger, 83, American politician, U.S. Representative (1967–1977) and Arizona Senator (1960–1967), complications from a stroke.
- James Sullivan, 86, American public administrator, city manager of Cambridge, Massachusetts (1968–1970, 1974–1981), and Lowell, Massachusetts (1970–1974).

=== 27 ===
- L. Adaikalaraj, 76, Indian politician.
- Eddie Bert, 90, American jazz trombonist.
- Sachiko Eto, 65, Japanese cult leader and serial killer, executed.
- Aleksandr Gorelik, 67, Russian pair skater and figure skating commentator.
- R. B. Greaves, 68, American singer ("Take a Letter Maria"), prostate cancer.
- Herbert Lom, 95, Czech-born British actor (The Pink Panther, Spartacus, Gambit).
- Ted Boy Marino, 72, Italian-born Brazilian actor and telecatch wrestler, cardiac arrest.
- Joseph Parker Jr., 95, American Navy physician, last surviving physician from Omaha Beach.
- John Silber, 86, American academic, President of Boston University, kidney failure.
- Sanjay Surkar, 53, Indian Marathi film director, heart attack.
- Bob Tetzlaff, 76, American Olympic cyclist.
- Frank Wilson, 71, American songwriter and record producer, prostate cancer.

=== 28 ===
- Avraham Adan, 85, Israeli major general, cardiac arrest.
- Crispin Aubrey, 66, British journalist.
- Lateef Adegbite, 79, Nigerian politician and Muslim leader.
- Juan Baena, 62, Spanish footballer (Hércules CF), complications from brain surgery.
- Richard Bocking, 81, Canadian filmmaker.
- James E. Burke, 87, American businessman, CEO of Johnson & Johnson (1976–1989).
- Larry Cunningham, 74, Irish showband singer.
- Chris Economaki, 91, American motorsports journalist.
- Sam Gruneisen, 71, American football player (San Diego Chargers).
- Joe Habie, 55, Guatemalan businessman (Tikal Futura), helicopter crash.
- Kevin Harrold, 83, Australian politician, member of the New South Wales Legislative Assembly (1973–1976).
- Jack Koehler, 82, German-born American media executive, White House communications director (1987), pancreatic cancer.
- Robert Manning, 92, American journalist, lymphoma.
- Abdul Ghani Minhat, 76, Malaysian footballer, complications following surgery.
- Brajesh Mishra, 83, Indian diplomat, National Security Advisor (1998–2004), coronary artery disease.
- Michael O'Hare, 60, American actor (Babylon 5, C.H.U.D., The Ambulance), heart attack.
- Ahmed Ramzy, 82, Egyptian actor (Sira` Fi al-Mina, Thartharah Fawq al-Nil), injuries from a fall.
- M. S. Shinde, 83, Indian film editor (Sholay).
- Pierluigi Vigna, 79, Italian magistrate, cancer.
- Stanisław Waśkiewicz, 65, Polish runner.

=== 29 ===
- Hathloul bin Abdulaziz Al Saud, 70, Saudi Arabian prince, member of the House of Saud.
- Abdul Haq Baloch, 34, Pakistani journalist, shot.
- Carlos Büsser, 84, Argentine rear admiral, led the 1982 invasion of the Falkland Islands, heart attack.
- Hebe Camargo, 83, Brazilian television presenter, cardiac arrest.
- Robin Fior, 77, English graphic designer.
- Foulath Hadid, 75, Iraqi writer and academic.
- Michael Henry Heim, 69, American translator and academic, cancer.
- Abdul Rahim Malhas, 75, Jordanian politician, Health Minister (1993–1994), member of the House of Representatives (2003–2007).
- Henry F. May, 97, American historian.
- Nancy Millis, 90, Australian microbiologist.
- Yvonne Mounsey, 93, U.S.-based South African ballet dancer (New York City Ballet), cancer.
- Antônio Maria Mucciolo, 89, Italian-born Brazilian Roman Catholic prelate, Archbishop of Botucatu (1989–2000), multiple organ failure.
- Nan Huai-Chin, 95, Chinese Buddhist scholar, pneumonia.
- John M. Rodgers, 84, American politician, member of the Pennsylvania House of Representatives.
- Nao Saejima, 44, Japanese model and actress, cancer.
- László Sebők, 74, Hungarian Olympic boxer.
- Knut Sydsæter, 74, Norwegian mathematician, drowning.
- Neil Smith, 58, Scottish geographer, multiple organ failure.
- Bob Stevens, 88, American college basketball coach (Oklahoma, South Carolina), boating accident.
- Arthur Ochs Sulzberger, 86, American publisher (The New York Times).
- Mark Wiener, 61, American painter.
- Malcolm Wicks, 65, British politician, MP for Croydon North West (1992–1997) and Croydon North (since 1997), cancer.
- Rakitha Wimaladarma, 27, Sri Lankan cricketer.

=== 30 ===
- Turhan Bey, 90, Austrian-born American actor, Parkinson's disease.
- James Burchett, 81, Australian judge.
- Barry Commoner, 95, American biologist and politician, founder of the Citizen's Party, 1980 presidential nominee.
- María Eugenia Cordovez, 77, Ecuadorian First Lady (1984–1988), former wife of León Febres Cordero, cardiac arrest.
- Autran Dourado, 86, Brazilian writer, stomach bleeding.
- Gaariye, 63, Somalian poet.
- Dorothy Gillespie, 92, American artist and sculptor.
- Bobby Jaggers, 64, American professional wrestler, renal failure.
- Clara Stanton Jones, 99, American librarian, President of the American Library Association (1976–1977).
- Mary Freeman-Grenville, 12th Lady Kinloss, 90, Scottish peer.
- Mark R. Kravitz, 62, American federal judge, amyotrophic lateral sclerosis.
- P. J. Morley, 81, Irish politician, TD for Mayo East (1977–1997).
- Jack Morris, 84, American Jesuit, founder of the Jesuit Volunteer Corps, cancer.
- Raylene Rankin, 52, Canadian singer (The Rankin Family), breast cancer.
- Barbara Ann Scott, 84, Canadian figure skater, Olympic gold medalist (1948).
- Boris Šprem, 56, Croatian politician, President of Parliament (since 2011), plasmacytoma.
- Bob Wade, 92, American crime writer.
- Wang Zhongcheng, 86, Chinese academic.
- Jonathan Wentz, 21, American paralympic equestrian.
- Joseph B. Willigers, 81, Dutch-born Ugandan Roman Catholic prelate, Bishop of Jinja (1967–2010).
