= Keith Lewis =

Keith Lewis can refer to:

- Keith Lewis (Australian cricketer) (1923-2012), Australian cricketer
- Keith Lewis (English cricketer) (1929-2015), English cricketer
- Keith Lewis (safety) (born 1981), American football player
- Keith Lewis (cornerback) (born 1989), American football player
