= Sikhism in Catalonia =

Religious minority in Catalonia

The Sikh community of Catalonia is a religious and cultural community originating from the Indian region of Punjab. Estimates of the Sikh population in Catalonia range from a 2015 estimate of 5,000 to a 2022 estimate of 13,000, though there is no official data in Catalonia recording citizens by religious affiliation.

== History ==
According to Sikh community testimony, the first Sikhs arrived in Barcelona in the late 1970s through early 1980s, with migration accelerating after repression of the Sikh population in India following the murder of Indira Gandhi. The Sikh population is noted to be predominantly male, and more likely to work under precarious employment conditions than the broader Catalonian population.

In Catalonia, Sikhs began arriving in the 1980s, drawn to region by jobs in the food processing industry. It was not until the 2000s, however, that the community became important, especially in Barcelona and Girona. As of 2017, 60% of the total Sikh population in Spain is situated in Catalonia. The reason why many Sikhs have migrated to Catalonia, according to interviews undertaken by is Kathryn Lum, is that there is greater competition for jobs in Madrid by migrants from Latin America and Morocco, "who possess better Spanish linguistic capital than Punjabis". Furthermore, the first Sikhs to settle there naturally lead to "chain migration" due to there being an established Sikh community in Catalonia.

The Sikh Community of Catalonia won the 4th edition of the Martí Gasull i Roig Award for excellence in the defense of the language, in the popular vote category. The finalists were La Bressola and Softcatalà. In this edition of the awards, which are given by the Plataforma per la Llengua, grammarian and linguist Albert Jané has also been recognized, with the Special Jury Prize for his career.

== Festivities ==
In Catalonia, Sikhs celebrate the Nagar Kirtan festival, a public procession that takes place through the streets. This procession takes place in municipalities where there is a gurdwara, such as Vic, Lloret de Mar or Badalona.

They also celebrate Vaisakhi, the Sikh new year, which at the same time commemorates the creation of the Khalsa, a religious order that brings together all baptized Sikhs. To celebrate this festival, it is essential for the Sikhs to take out the Guru Granth Sahib, their holy book, in procession. During these events, food is distributed to everyone, martial arts demonstrations are made and sacred songs are performed with music.

== Notable gurdwaras ==
The first gurdwara established in Barcelona was the Nanaksar Gurdwara, in the Sants neighbourhood, which was founded in 1992. The next to be founded was the Gurdarshan Sahib Gurdwara, in the Raval area of Barcelona. Both serve primarily immigrants from Punjab and Delhi. Founded later was the Barcelona Hospital gurdwara, which is stated to feed around 1,500 people per day.

== Representation ==
The spokesperson for the Sikh community in Catalonia is Gurdev Singh i Khalsa, a young Vigatan of Indian origin born in Catalonia.

Accredited disseminator of Sikhism, he represents the Sikh community before government institutions on a national scale and is the point of reference in the field.

On March 8, 2020, she held a prominent feminist event on public streets to demand equality from a more religious point of view; with the presence of various faiths and associations.

== See also ==
- Religion in Catalonia
- Sikhism in Spain
