= Robert Fink =

Robert Fink may refer to:

- Robert Morgan Fink (1915–2012), American biochemistry professor at UCLA
- Robert O. Fink (1905–1988), American papyrologist
- Doctor Fink (born 1958), stage name of Matthew Robert Fink, American musician
