= Biraghi =

Biraghi is an Italian surname. Notable people with the surname include:

- Cristiano Biraghi (born 1992), Italian footballer
- Guglielmo Biraghi (1927–2001), Italian film critic and festival director
- Luigi Biraghi (1801–1879), Italian Roman Catholic priest
