= Reubin =

Reubin is a masculine given name. Notable people with the name include:

- Reubin Andres, American gerontologist
- Reubin Askew, American politician
- Reubin Clein, American publisher
- Reubin Field, a member of the Lewis and Clark Expedition

== See also ==
- Reuben
