= Stephen Paul =

Stephen, Steven, or Steve Paul may refer to:

- Stephen Paul (physicist) (1953–2012), physicist at Princeton University
- Stephen Paul (woodworker) (born 1951), American woodworker and craft distiller
- Esteban (musician) (Stephen Paul, born 1948), American guitarist
- Steve Paul (1941–2012), manager of Johnny Winter and club owner
- Steven Paul (born 1959), film producer and manager
- Steven M. Paul, neuroscientist and pharmaceutical executive
- Steven Paul (fencer) (1954-2019), British fencer.

== See also ==
- Steve Jobs (1955–2011), American tech mogul, full name Steven Paul Jobs
