= Philippe Christory =

French Catholic prelate

His Excellency Philippe Christory
- Bishop of Chartres
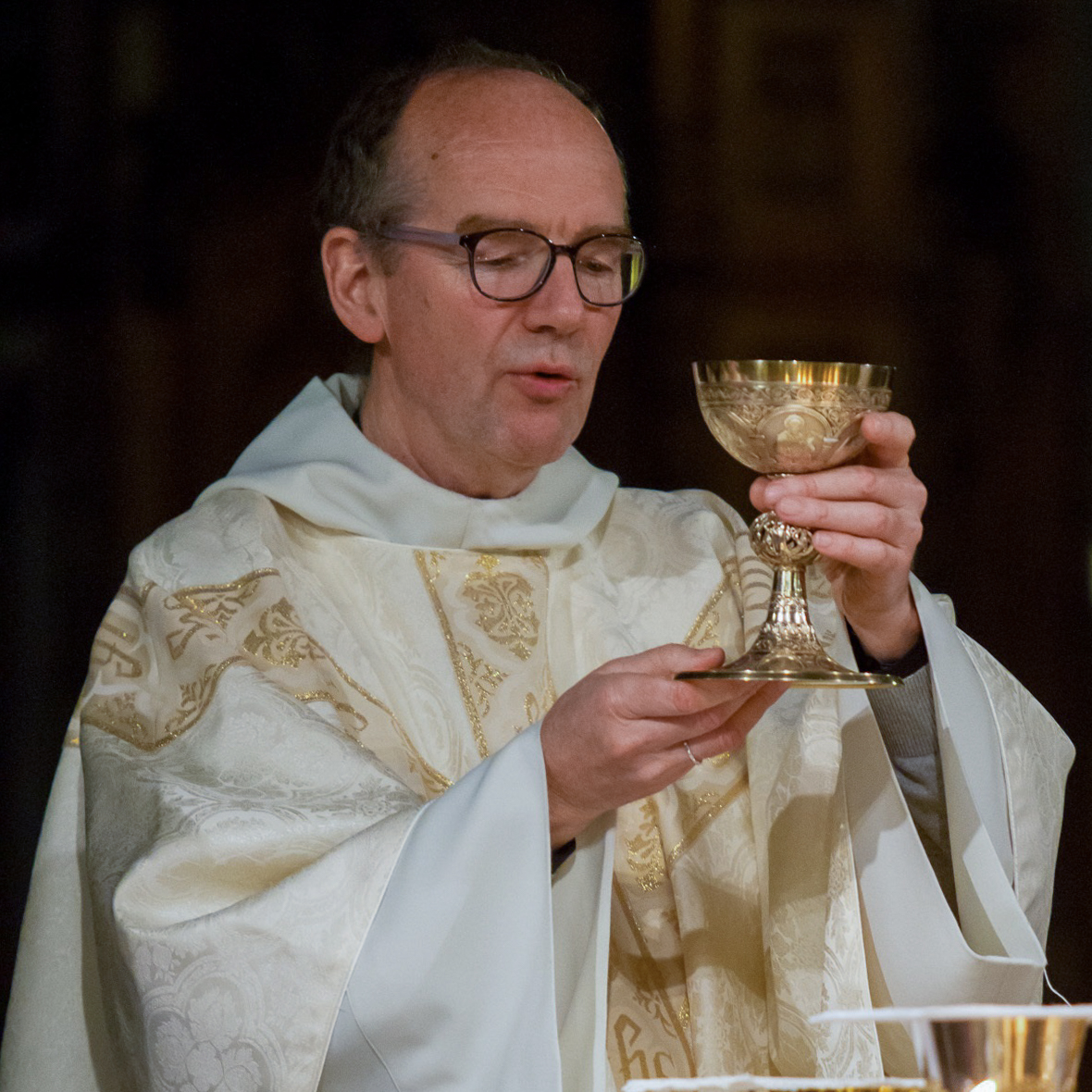
- Church: Roman Catholic Church
- See: Diocese of Chartres

Orders
- Ordination: 27 June 1992
- Consecration: 15 April 2018

Personal details
- Born: Philippe Maurice Marie Joseph Christory; 28 February 1958 (age 68) Tourcoing, France
- Education: Pontifical Gregorian University; Marianum Pontifical Institute
- Motto: JE SUIS VENU POUR QU’ILS AIENT LA VIE EN ABONDANCE
- Coat of arms

Styles of Philippe Christory
- Reference style: The Most Reverend
- Spoken style: Your Excellency
- Religious style: Monsignor
- Posthumous style: not applicable

Philippe Christory (born February 28, 1958, in Tourcoing), is a French Catholic prelate, and bishop of Chartres since his nomination on February 2, 2018.

== Life ==
=== Youth ===
Christory was born into a practising Catholic family. He lost faith and stopped practising at the age of 16. in 1984, he discovered the charismatic renewal within a prayer group of the Emmanuel Community.

=== Formation ===
He is a qualified engineer, after he graduated from the ICAM engineering school in Lille in 1980. He completed his military service as a mechanical officer in the Marine Nationale, after which, he travelled around Asie from 5 months and then worked as an engineer in Sudan and in France. He entered the Pontifical French Seminary in Rome and attended classes at the Pontifical Gregorian University and the Marianum Pontifical Institute. He holds a canonical licence in theology with a special mention in mariology.

=== Priesthood ===
As a member of the Communauté de l'Emmanuel, he was ordained as a priest on June 27, 1992, for the archidiocese of Paris. From 1992 to 1998, he served as a vicar at the Parisian parish of the Sainte-Trinité and as a youth chaplain for the lycée Condorcet. In 1998, he was appointed as parish priest at Saint-Nicolas-des-Champs, where he remained until 2004. From 2001 to 2003, he also served as spiritual director at the Catholic seminary in Paris and was in charge of the Saint-Martin-de-Tours formation house, which hosts Parisian seminarians from the Emmanuel community.

From 2004 to 2007, he was sent on mission to the diocese of Fréjus-Toulon where he was appointed as parish priest in solidum at Sainte-Maxime and Cogolin.

He returned to Paris where he was parish priest at Saint-Laurent from 2007 to 2015 and then at the Sainte-Trinité from 2014 to 2018 when he was made a bishop.

From 2002 to 2011, he was also a member of the international board of the Emmanuel community.

=== Bishop of Chartres ===
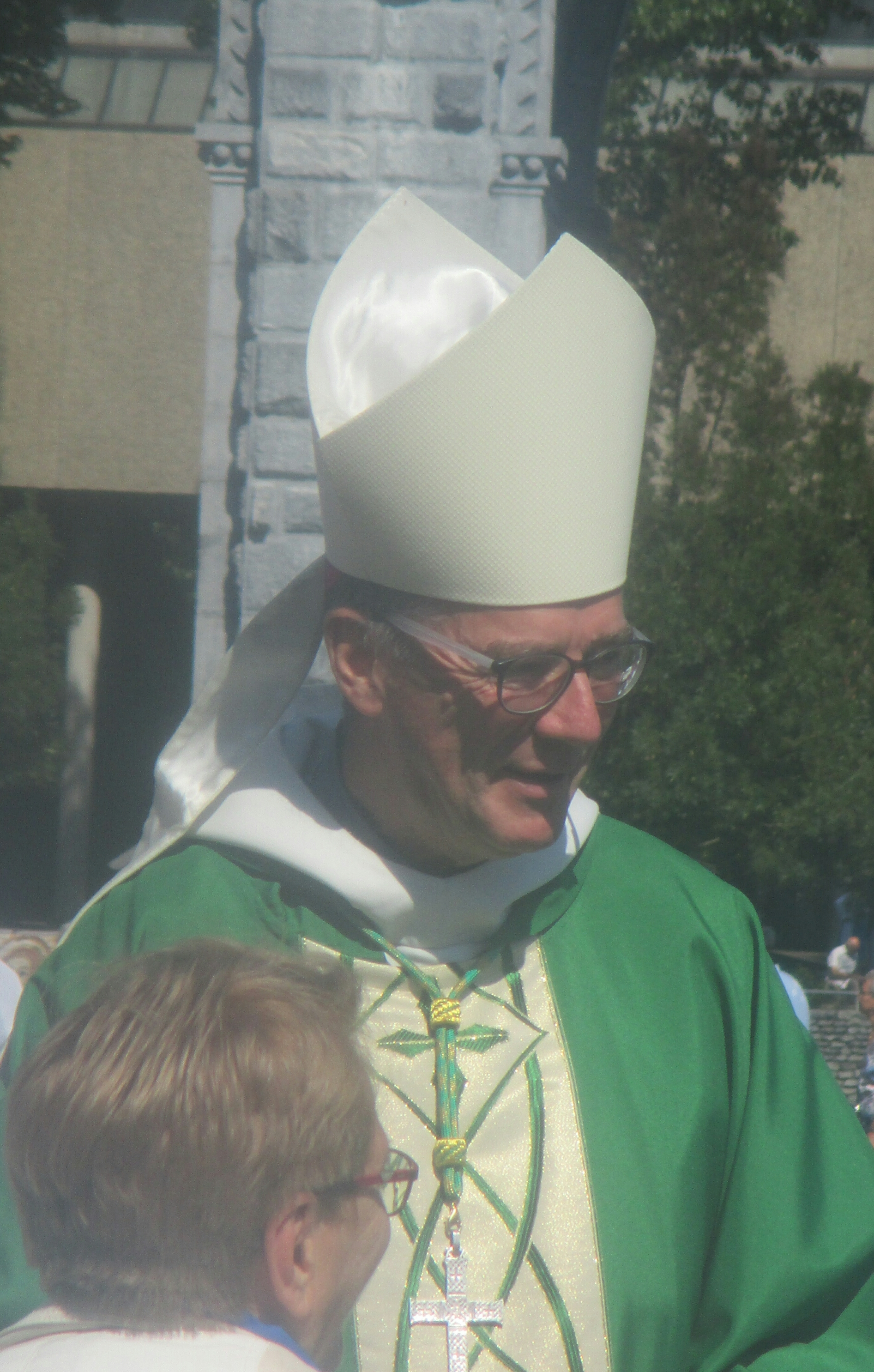
Bishop Christory in 2019.

On February 2, 2018, Pope Francis named him bishop of Chartres, a see vacant since the nomination of bishop Michel Pansard as bishop of Évry on August 1, 2017. His episcopal ordination took place on April 15, 2018, in the cathedral of Chartres.

== See also ==
- Community of the Emmanuel
