= Patrícia Gabancho =

Spanish author and journalist

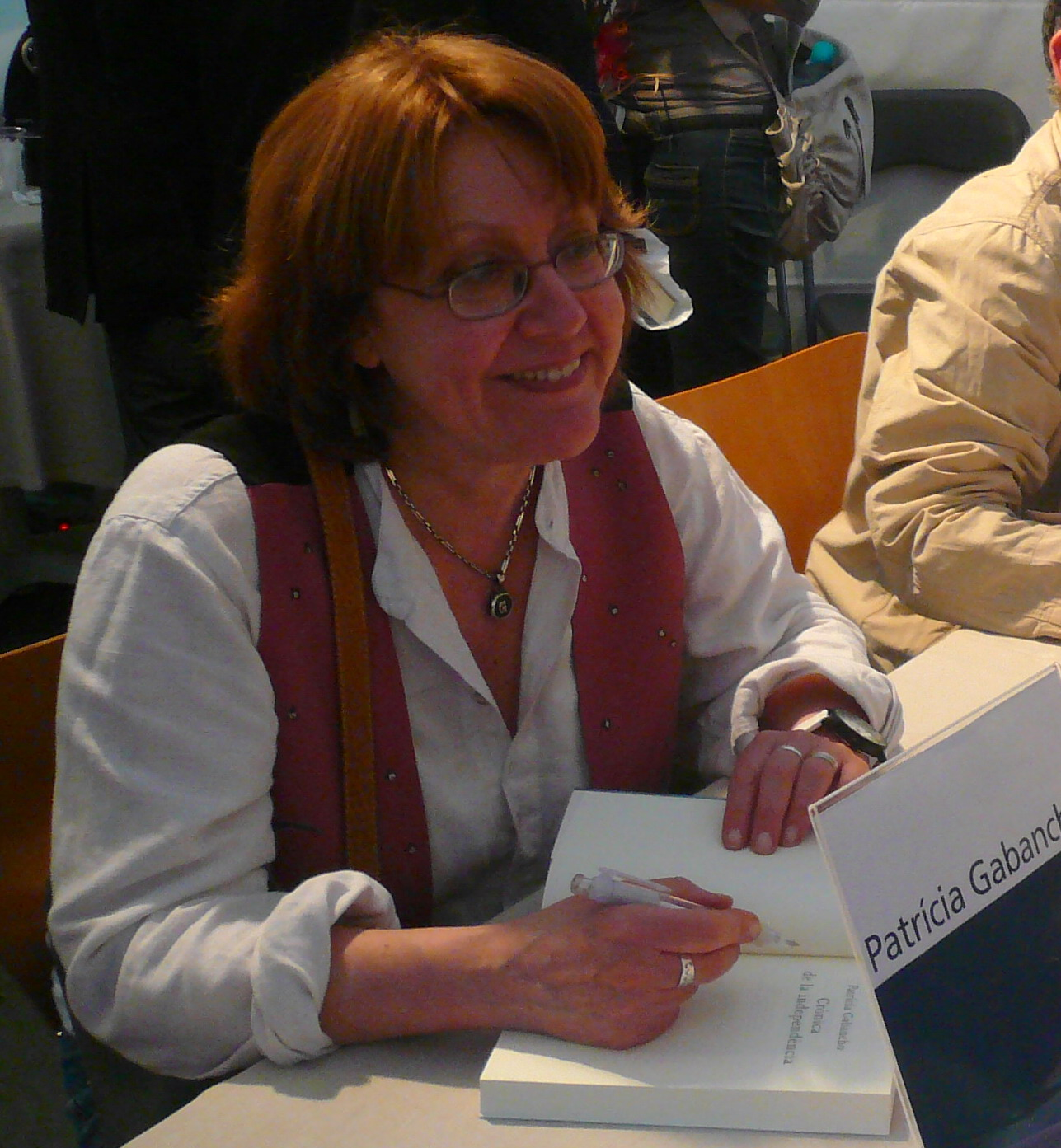
Gabancho in April 2008

Patrícia Gabancho Ghielmetti (29 September 1952 – 28 November 2017) was an Argentine-born Spanish author and journalist, writing in Catalan. She primarily focused her writings on culture (including theatre, tango and literature), history, politics and urbanism, especially in regards to Barcelona and Catalan culture. She was an active member in the Catalan movement and a member of La Plataforma per la Llengua. In 2012, she was awarded the Prudenci Bertrana Prize for her novel La néta d'Adam.

Born in Buenos Aires, Gabancho emigrated to Barcelona the day prior to her 22nd birthday. She died due to lung cancer in 2017 at the age of 65.

== Selected works ==
- Cultura rima amb confitura (1980)
- Sobre la immigració (2001)
- La batalla de l’Estatut (2006)
- El preu de ser catalans. Una cultura mil·lenària en vies d’extinció (2007)
- El fil secret de la història (2008)
- El preu de ser catalans (2008)
- Apàtrides, incultes i (de vegades) analfabets (2008)
- La batalla de l’Estatut (2008)
- El retorn dels catalans (2010)
- A la intempèrie. Una memòria cruel de la Transició catalana (1976-1978) (2011)
- L'autonomia que ens cal és la de Portugal (2012)
- La néta d'Adam (2012)
- Les dones del 1714 (2014)
- Amàlia i els esperits (2017)
