= Kathryn Ferguson Fink =

American biochemist

- Born: February 13, 1917; State Center, Iowa
- Died: March 28, 1989 (aged 72); Los Angeles, California
- Education: State University of Iowa, University of Rochester
- Scientific career
- Fields: Nuclear medicine, Biochemistry
- Workplaces: University of California, Los Angeles

Kathryn Ferguson Fink (February 13, 1917 – March 28, 1989) was an American biochemist known for her work in nuclear medicine, particularly in the use of radiolabeling to study metabolism. Fink spent most of her career at the University of California, Los Angeles, often collaborating with her fellow biochemist husband Robert Morgan Fink, and was the first Ph.D. to become a Professor of Medicine at the UCLA School of Medicine. She died of cancer in 1989.

== Early life and education ==
Fink was born in State Center, Iowa on February 13, 1917. She received her bachelor's degree in biochemistry (with high distinction) from the State University of Iowa in 1938. She received her Ph.D. from the University of Rochester in 1943, where she met her husband and longtime scientific collaborator Robert Morgan Fink. Her early career was supported by a fellowship from the National Research Council related to the Manhattan Project, which she held until 1947, working with Stafford Warren.

== Academic career ==
Warren recruited the Finks to UCLA when he became the dean of the then-new School of Medicine there. Kathryn began at UCLA in 1947. Her initial appointment as assistant clinical professor was in the Department of Biophysics and Nuclear Medicine at UCLA and in the Research Division of the Van Nuys Veteran's Administration Hospital, where she worked as a Research Biochemist. She and her husband both published extensively on the use of radiolabeling in conjunction with paper chromatography for the study of metabolic pathways, with clinical applications to cancer patients receiving chemotherapy. She was appointed a Professor of Medicine at the UCLA School of Medicine in 1967, the first Ph.D. to hold that position traditionally occupied by those with M.D. degrees. In 1976, Fink became an Assistant Dean of Student Affairs and Chairman of the Scholarships and Fellowships Committee at UCLA.

== Awards and memberships ==
Fink was a member of a number of professional and scholarly societies, including Phi Beta Kappa, Iota Sigma Pi, Sigma Xi, Society of Experimental Biology and Medicine, and the American Society of Biological Chemists. She was the 19th recipient of the UCLA Woman of Science Award in 1971. She was also chosen as the Los Angeles Times Woman of the Year in Science in 1971.

== Personal life ==
Fink and her husband had two daughters. Fink died of cancer in Los Angeles in 1989.
