= Cesare Rickler =

Italian footballer and rally driver (born 1987)

Personal information
- Full name: Cesare Gianfranco Rickler Del Mare
- Date of birth: 18 March 1987 (age 39)
- Place of birth: Viareggio, Italy
- Height: 1.96 m (6 ft 5 in)
- Position: Centre back

Youth career
- –2001: Calcio Lido
- 2001–2002: Pistoiese
- 2002–2004: Pisa
- 2004–2005: Chievo

Senior career*
Years	Team	Apps	(Gls)
2005–2011	Chievo	21	(0)
2008–2009	→ Piacenza (loan)	20	(2)
2009–2010	→ Modena (loan)	34	(0)
2010–2011	→ Piacenza (loan)	23	(1)
2011–2016	Bologna	0	(0)
2013–2014	→ Mantova (loan)	14	(2)
2014–2015	→ Prato (loan)	13	(0)

International career
2007	Italy U-20	2	(0)
- * Club domestic league appearances and goals as of end of 1314 season

Cesare Rickler (born 18 March 1987) is a former Italian footballer and is currently a rally driver.

== Career ==
=== Chievo ===
Rickler made his first team debut on 18 April 2007 in an away match against Lazio, ended in a 0–0 tie.

Rickler had only played 4 matches in Serie A and 17 in Serie B with Chievo, rest of his Chievo career was spent on loan to Serie B clubs.

=== Bologna ===
In June 2011 Rickler was exchanged with Alessandro Bassoli in co-ownership deal. Both players' 50% registration rights were tagged for €1.5 million. He signed a 5-year contract, which worth €100,000 in net in the first season and would gradually increased to €120,000 in the last 3 seasons, plus bonuses. The deal was criticized as financial trick or even creative accounting, as the aggressive price tag of both players only improved 2010–11 financial result (selling profit nearly €3M) and created an amortization cost of €3 million (€600,000 each for 5 seasons) from 2011 to 2016, with both players performance were impaired with costing the club €600,000.

Moreover, following Rickler was banned for 4 years, Bologna would never recovered the residual contract value €2.4M, thus both club gave up the bought back rights in June 2012. Bologna also write-down the contract value of Rickler for a season for €600,985 in the financial year to make his contract residual value "worth" around €1.8 million in accounting on 1 July 2012 (however followed the ban shortened, the write-down reverted).

=== Italian football scandal ===
Rickler had been questioned by prosecutor since March 2012. On 18 June 2012 Rickler was suspended for 4 years due to involvement in 2011–12 Italian football scandal. His Piacenza and Chievo teammate Alessandro Sbaffo also request to ban 3-year and 3 months by procurator. However Sbaffo's plea bargain was successful reduced the ban by heavy fine, but Rickler employed the lawyer to defence and failed to acquit the charge. Rickler's appeal to "Corte di Giustizia Federale" was dismissed on 6 July 2012. However his ban was shorten by Tribunale Nazionale di Arbitrato per lo Sport to 14 months after appeal.

=== Mantova (loan) ===
In April 2013 Rickler's ban was shortened; on 21 August 2013 Rickler left for fourth division club Mantova F.C.

=== Prato (loan) ===
In July 2014 joined on loan to Prato.

=== International career ===
He also made a total two appearances with the Italian Under-20 squad, and was also selected once for the Italian U-21 team.

== Motorsport ==
Rickler has participated in Rally raid events since leaving football, including multiple appearances in the Dakar Rally in the trucks category.

=== Dakar Rally results ===
Year	Class	Vehicle	Position
2017	Trucks	(Italy) Iveco	40th
2019	Trucks	(Italy) Iveco	Not Classified
2020	Trucks	(Italy) Iveco	Not Classified
2022	Trucks	(Italy) Iveco	DNF
2023	Trucks	(Germany) MAN	TBD

== Personal ==
His grandfather Gianfranco Dell'Innocenti played almost 300 games in the Serie A in the 1940s and 1950s.
