= Michel Joseph Kuehn =

French prelate

His Excellency Michel Joseph Kuehn
- Bishop of Chartres
- Church: Roman Catholic Church
- See: Roman Catholic Diocese of Chartres
- In office: 1978 - 1991
- Predecessor: Roger Jean Fernand Michon
- Successor: Jacques Jean Joseph Jules Perrier
- Previous post: Prelate

Orders
- Ordination: 12 July 1947
- Consecration: 30 September 1978 by Jean-Félix-Albert-Marie Vilnet

Personal details
- Born: 7 October 1923 Saint-Dié, France
- Died: 18 September 2012 (aged 88)

Michel Joseph Kuehn (7 October 1923 – 18 September 2012) was a French prelate of the Catholic Church.

Michel Joseph Kuehn was born in Saint-Dié, France, ordained a priest on 12 July 1947 and appointed bishop of the Diocese of Chartres on 27 July 1978. He was ordained bishop on 30 September 1978, where he would remain until his resignation on 6 April 1991.

== See also ==
- Diocese of Chartres
