= Angelo Amodeo =

The Right Reverend Monsignor Angelo Amodeo
- Canon of the Cathedral Chapter of Milan
- Church: Roman Catholic Church
- See: Milan

Orders
- Ordination: 1957 by Giovanni Battista Montini

Personal details
- Born: 10 March 1932 Abbiategrasso, Milan, Italy
- Died: 14 September 2012 (aged 80) Milan, Italy
- Buried: Castelletto Cemetery, Abbiategrasso, Milan, Italy
- Denomination: Roman Catholic

Angelo Amodeo (10 March 1932 - 14 September 2012) was an Italian Roman Catholic Priest and Canon of the Metropolitan Chapter of the Cathedral of Milan.

== Biography ==
On 10 March 1932, Angelo Amodeo was born in Abbiategrasso, a town in the Metropolitan City in Milan.

He was ordained priest in 1957 by the Archbishop of Milan, Giovanni Battista Montini (the future Pope Paul VI).

As the archdiocese's notary, Amodeo has been present at the canonical exhumations of Blesseds Luigi Biraghi and Carlo Gnocchi.

Amodeo was a great advocate of the ancient Ambrosian Rite, dedicating most of his life to the preservation of the traditional Ambrosian liturgy and the use of traditional Ambrosian chant.

In 2008, Amodeo celebrated the golden jubilee of his priestly ordination, celebrating the Pontifical Mass "ad instar abbatum" according to the traditional Ambrosian Rite, as the privilege granted to the Canons of the Cathedral of Milan, Amodeo wore the full Pontifical vestments for the Mass, including the Pontifical dalmatic and the Mitre.

On 14 September 2012, Amodeo died after a period of illness; he was 80. His funeral mass was held at the Cathedral of Milan on 17 September, his remains was buried in the Castelletto Cemetery in Abbiategrasso.
