= Alan Cleveley =

English cricketer

Personal information
- Full name: Alan Barnard Cleveley
- Born: 5 January 1932 (age 94); Chaddesden, Derbyshire, England
- Died: 17 September 2012; Derby, England
- Batting: Right-handed
- Bowling: Right-arm fast-medium

Domestic team information
- Years: Team
- 1955: Nottinghamshire

Career statistics
Competition	First-class
Matches	1
Runs scored	4
Batting average	4.00
100s/50s	–/–
Top score	4*
Balls bowled	228
Wickets	3
Bowling average	35.66
5 wickets in innings	–
10 wickets in match	–
Best bowling	3/63
Catches/stumpings	–/–
- Source: Cricinfo, 5 March 2013

Alan Barnard Cleveley (born 5 January 1932 – 17 September 2012) is a former English cricketer. Cleveley was a right-handed batsman who bowled right-arm fast-medium. He was born at Chaddesden, Derbyshire.

Cleveley made a single first-class appearance for Nottinghamshire against Essex at Trent Bridge in the 1955 County Championship. Essex won the toss and elected to bat first, making 264 all out, during which Cleveley bowled 17 wicketless overs which conceded 44 runs. Nottinghamshire then made 320 all out in their first-innings, with Cleveley ending the innings not out on 4 runs. He took the wickets of Paul Gibb, Trevor Bailey and Ray Smith in Essex's second-innings of 270/8 declared, finishing with figures of 3/63 from 21 overs. Requiring 215 for victory, Nottinghamshire were dismissed for just 119, with Cleveley being dismissed for a duck by Dickie Dodds, with Essex winning by 95 runs. This was his only first-class appearance.
