= Mary DeMelim =

American academic administrator

Mary R. DeMelim (September 6, 1930 – September 21, 2012) was an American academic administrator who served as executive director of The Institute of Management Science (TIMS) for many years.

== Career ==
TIMS had been founded in 1954, but went through a time of troubles in the 1960s, in which the business office moved three times and the executive directorship changed hands four times. In 1968, DeMelim was brought in as the first full-time executive director; under her leadership the institute stabilized and grew, and she kept her position until 1995, when TIMS merged with another society to form the Institute for Operations Research and the Management Sciences (INFORMS). After the merger she continued to work for INFORMS as a consultant.

== Recognition ==
In 1994, TIMS gave DeMelim their Distinguished Service Medal (now the George E. Kimball Medal), the only time they gave it to someone who was not a professional in management science. She was also named as a Fellow of INFORMS in 2004.

== Personal life ==
DeMelim's husband, John E. DeMelim, was a professor at the Rhode Island School of Design, and occasionally assisted DeMelim with design tasks for TIMS. DeMelim's personal hobbies included world travel and the creation of art jewelry.
