= Ralph Marshall =

Bermudian politician, architect, and civil engineer

Ralph Marshall CBE

Member of the Parliament of Bermuda for Southampton West
- In office 1963–1993

Personal details
- Born: 4 May 1927
- Died: 18 September 2012 (aged 85) King Edward Memorial Hospital
- Cause of death: Pneumonia
- Party: United Bermuda Party

Ralph Owen Marshall, CBE, (4 May 1927 – 18 September 2012) was a Bermudian politician, architect, and civil engineer who served as the MP for the Southampton West constituency from 1963 to 1993. Marshall was one of the first members of the United Bermuda Party (UBP) to serve in the Parliament of Bermuda. He was also the first MP of Portuguese descent, as well as the first Bermudian of Portuguese descent to establish a career on Bermuda. In 1972, Marshall became the first Portuguese-Bermudian Cabinet Minister. He was later appointed the first Portuguese-Bermudian Commander of the Order of the British Empire in 1992.

Marshall was born on 4 May 1927. He attended Greenfield Primary, Port Royal School in Southampton and then the Mount Allison Academy. Marshall enrolled at Mount Allison University in New Brunswick and the former Nova Scotia Technical College (now part of Dalhousie University), receiving his Bachelor of Engineering in 1951. He married his late wife, Patricia Francis Vallis, and the couple had three children – Belinda, Marsha and Blake.

In 1954, Marshall and Louis Bernardo co-founded the Marshall-Bernardo Partnership, an architectural and civil engineering firm. In doing so, Marshall became the first Portuguese-Bermudian to establish a professional career on the island. The firm has designed and constructed notable buildings in Bermuda, including Bermuda College, Grotto Bay, the Washington Mall and Belco.

Marshall was first elected to the House of Assembly of Bermuda in 1963 from Southampton West. The political class of 1963 who entered parliament with Marshall also included Sir John Sharpe and Dame Lois Browne-Evans.

During his thirty-year tenure, Marshall held several cabinet portfolios as Minister of Transport from 1972 to 1974; Minister of Works, Agriculture & Fisheries from 1974 to 1976 and again from 1978 to 1981; Minister of Health in 1976; Minister without Portfolio in 1977; and a second stint as Minister of Transport from 1989 until his retirement in 1993. He was also the first Bermudian to serve on the Executive of the Commonwealth Parliamentary Association.

Marshall lived with Parkinson's disease for the last twelve years of his life. He died from pneumonia at King Edward Memorial Hospital on 18 September 2012 at the age of 85. He had resided in Peacehaven, Sandys Parish.
