= Keith Lewis (English cricketer) =

English cricketer (1929–2015)

Personal information
- Full name: Leslie Keith Lewis
- Born: 25 September 1929; East Finchley, Middlesex, England
- Died: 10 October 2015 (aged 86)
- Batting: Right-handed

Domestic team information
- Years: Team
- 1952–1953: Cambridge University

Career statistics
Competition	First-class
Matches	6
Runs scored	155
Batting average	15.50
100s/50s	0/1
Top score	53*
Catches/stumpings	2/–
- Source: Cricinfo, 26 May 2020

Leslie Keith Lewis (25 September 1929 – 10 October 2015) was an English first-class cricketer who played for Cambridge University in 1952 and 1953.

Keith Lewis attended Taunton School, where he was School Captain and played for the First XI, setting a record for the highest score for the school, 186 against Downside School, in 1948. After two years of National Service in the Army he went up to Pembroke College, Cambridge, to study Law and Economics. He gained his cricket and hockey blues, captaining the university hockey team. A middle-order batsman, his highest score was 53 not out against Surrey in 1953. He also played hockey for Middlesex.

After finishing his studies he was employed by the meat suppliers Borthwick and Sons for 23 years, including periods in Australia and New Zealand. He married Elizabeth Winyard in 1955, and they had two sons and a daughter. They were married for more than 60 years.
