= Harold Dunaway =

American stock car and sprint car driver

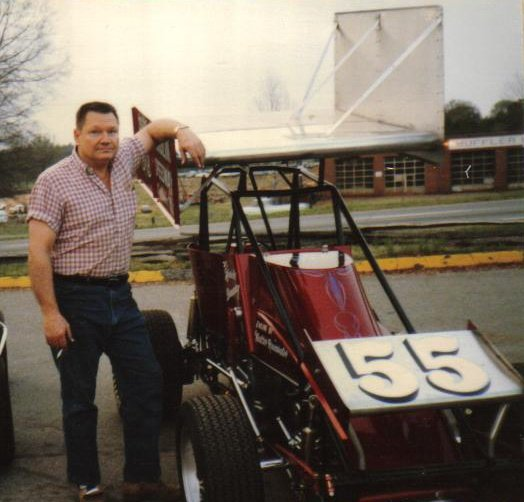
- Dunaway with #55 Outlaw Mini Sprint
- Born: October 7, 1933; Mecklenburg County, North Carolina, U.S.
- Died: September 3, 2012 (aged 78); Gaston Memorial Hospital, Gastonia, North Carolina

NASCAR Cup Series career
- 1 race run over 1 year
- Best finish: 123rd (1966)
- First race: 1966 Peach Blossom 500 (Rockingham)
Wins	Top tens	Poles
0	0	0

Harold Glenn Dunaway (October 7, 1933 – September 3, 2012) was an American stock car and sprint car driver. He made one start in the NASCAR Grand National Series.

== Early and personal life ==
A native of Mecklenburg County, North Carolina, he was the son of racer Glenn Dunaway. Dunaway fought in the Korean War, serving in the United States Air Force. He was a certified private pilot and scuba diver. He was married, to Frances, and had two children.

== Racing career ==
Dunaway was known as a North Carolina dirt track racer; he competed in NASCAR's Grand National Series, in a single race in 1966 at North Carolina Motor Speedway, driving a Plymouth and finishing 40th in a field of 44 cars. He later moved to sprint car racing, becoming a Dixie Outlaw Sprint Car Series competitor. He also competed several times in the Permatex 300, a Late Model Sportsman Division race that was run at Daytona International Speedway as a support race to the Daytona 500.

Date	Place	Division	Start	Finish	Car #	Car
February 26, 1966	Daytona International Speedway	NASCAR Modified	N/A	4	62	1963 Ford Sportsman
March 13, 1966	North Carolina Motor Speedway	NASCAR Grand National Series	36	40	86	1965 Plymouth
July 4, 1968	Daytona International Speedway	NASCAR Grand American	N/A	14	22	1968 Chevrolet Camaro
July 20, 1968	Bristol Motor Speedway	NASCAR Grand American	N/A	4	N/A	1968 Chevrolet Camaro
July 24, 1968	Peach State Speedway	NASCAR Grand American	N/A	4	N/A	1968 Chevrolet Camaro
August 3, 1968	Atlanta Motor Speedway	NASCAR Grand American	8	14	22	1968 Chevrolet Camaro
August 10, 1968	Smoky Mountain Raceway	NASCAR Grand American	N/A	4	N/A	1968 Chevrolet Camaro
August 31, 1968	Darlington Raceway	NASCAR Grand American	3	4	22	1968 Chevrolet Camaro
September 14, 1968	Augusta Speedway	NASCAR Grand American	N/A	6	N/A	1968 Chevrolet Camaro
September 28, 1968	North Wilkesboro Speedway	NASCAR Grand American	N/A	3	N/A	1968 Chevrolet Camaro
