= Nabil Abou Alqama =

Algerian jihadist

- Nabil Makhloufi
- Born: 1977
- Died: September 9, 2012 (aged 34–35); Gao Region, Mali
- Military career
- Allegiance: Algeria; GIA; GPSC; AQIM
- Branch: AQIM - Sahara
- Rank: Emir
- Conflicts: Algerian Civil War; Mali War

Nabil Makhloufi, nom de guerre Nabil Abou Alqama, was an Algerian jihadist who fought in the Algerian Civil War and the Mali War, and served as the head of Al-Qaeda in the Islamic Maghreb (AQIM)'s Sahara region between 2011 and 2012.

== Biography ==
Makhloufi was born in 1977. He deserted from the Algerian Army during the Algerian Civil War, joining the Armed Islamic Group (GIA). He later joined the Salafist Group for Preaching and Combat (GSPC), and then Al-Qaeda in the Islamic Maghreb, where he adopted the name Nabil Abou Alqama. He was captured by Algerian secret services during the Algerian Civil War, but was able to escape.

In 2011, AQIM emir Abdelmalek Droukdel appointed Alqama as emir of the Sahara region of AQIM to end a conflict between different katibas, or al-Qaeda affiliated sects, in the Sahara. Alqama was able to end these conflicts, and also served as AQIM's liaison for hostage negotiation and head of weapons reserves. He married a girl from an Arab family from the Kunta tribe, who he formed an alliance with.

Alqama died in a car accident on September 9, 2012, around 200 kilometers west of Gao, where he was en route to a meeting in the city that would bring various Malian jihadist groups together.
