= P-series fuels =

Fuel family

P-series fuels are a family of renewable, non-petroleum, liquid fuels that can substitute for gasoline. The blend of methyl tetrahydrofuran (MTHF), ethanol, and hydrocarbon constitute the P-series fuel. These fuels are clear, high-octane alternative fuels that can be used in flexible fuel vehicles. It addresses three problems: the need for non-petroleum energy sources, solid waste management, and affordability. The feedstock is not incinerated, but chemically digested, so there is no combustion with the accompanying toxic air emissions.
