= Nigel Leathern =

South African cricketer (1932–2012)

Personal information
- Full name: Nigel David Leathern
- Born: 1 June 1932; Pietermaritzburg, South Africa
- Died: 25 September 2012 (aged 80); Cape Town, South Africa
- Source: ESPNcricinfo, 24 June 2016

Nigel Leathern (1 June 1932 – 25 September 2012) was a South African cricketer. He played four first-class matches for Northerns between 1957 and 1959.
