= Luís d'Andrea =

Luís d'Andrea O.F.M. Conv.
- Bishop of Caxias do Maranhão
- Church: Catholic Church
- Diocese: Diocese of Caxias do Maranhão
- In office: 29 October 1987 – 19 March 2010
- Predecessor: Jorge Tobias de Freitas
- Successor: Vilsom Basso

Orders
- Ordination: 19 December 1959
- Consecration: 6 January 1988 by Pope John Paul II

Personal details
- Born: 23 February 1934 Albano, Province of Rome, Kingdom of Italy
- Died: 8 September 2012 (aged 78)

Luis d'Andrea (February 23, 1934 – September 8, 2012) was the Roman Catholic bishop of the Roman Catholic Diocese of Caxias do Maranhão, Brazil.

Ordained to the priesthood in 1959, d'Andrea was named bishop in 1987 and retired in 2010.
