= Gianfranco Dell'Innocenti =

Italian footballer

Personal information
- Date of birth: 16 November 1925
- Place of birth: Viareggio, Italy
- Date of death: 20 September 2012 (aged 86)
- Height: 1.77 m (5 ft 9 1/2 in)
- Position: Defender

Senior career*
Years	Team	Apps	(Gls)
1943–1944	Alba Roma	9	(0)
1945–1946	Alba Ala Roma		
1946–1947	Alba Trastevere	31	(?)
1947–1951	Roma	86	(1)
1951–1952	Lucchese	33	(0)
1952–1955	SPAL	102	(0)
1955–1956	Bologna	11	(0)
1956–1959	L.R. Vicenza	55	(0)
1959–1961	Viareggio	63	(0)
- * Club domestic league appearances and goals

Gianfranco Dell'Innocenti (16 November 1925 – 20 September 2012) was an Italian professional footballer.

He played for 12 seasons (287 games, one goal) in the Serie A for A.S. Roma, A.S. Lucchese Libertas 1905, SPAL 1907, Bologna F.C. 1909 and L.R. Vicenza.

His grandson Cesare Rickler is a professional footballer as well.
