= Mustaf Haji Mohamed =

Somalian politician

Mustaf Haji Mohamed (died September 22, 2012) was a Somali member of the Federal Parliament of Somalia.

He was fatally shot on September 22, 2012, in Mogadishu.
