= Maria Pia Gardini =

Maria Pia Gardini (born 14 October 1936, Rovereto – 23 September 2012, Grosseto) was an Italian entrepreneur and a former Scientologist.

When retired, she lived in Tuscany and was one of the most critical voices of the Church of Scientology. She was the cousin of Raul Gardini and worked in film and cinema advertising until 1985. That year, following her daughter and also to help in the process of detoxification from drugs, she entered into Scientology. She remained in that organization until 1994 after reaching the highest levels of technical Scientology (reaching the highest level available today: OT VIII) and becoming one of the most brilliant and appreciated "auditors" of the movement, resulting in the 1989 and 1990 Recognition of Scientology as the best "auditor" of the year. She has taken a strong critical attitude towards Scientology after she left it. From 1994 to 2002, she lived in Tunisia and worked as an entrepreneur.

== Her years in Scientology ==
In the mid-80s, Frederica, the daughter of Maria Pia Gardini, entered a Narconon center which belongs to the Church of Scientology. She convinced her mother, who was going through a difficult period because of her father's death, to attend the first of Scientology auditing sessions. Here her career within the organization began, through a disbursement of growing sums of money, and she became one of the most popular Scientology auditors (auditor Class IX). She reached the highest positions of the organization by entering the Sea Org. On 18 October 1990, her 29-year-old daughter, who had achieved OT VIII, died of AIDS. In 1991, the leadership of the organization denied Gardini permission to see her mother who was ill, because as Gardini said "the fact that my mother was dying was not important". In 1994, after spending nearly two million U.S. dollars on Scientology, Maria Pia Gardini began the process of leaving Scientology.

The Church gave her back $500,000.

== Criticism of Scientology and harassment ==
After leaving Scientology, Maria Pia Gardini, who was experiencing near bankruptcy, began to recount her experience and her years within the organization in the media. She published a book. Her testimony was very important as it came from a person who had reached the highest levels of the movement. It is also considered by the Church of Scientology as an inconvenient and unwelcome testimony since it evoked harassment and pressure from the organisation. The Church of Scientology replied that Maria Pia Gardini's criticism was false, as it came from an apostate. In 2005, Gardini said she was a victim of harassment from the Church. She was a member of an anti-cults association.

She died on 23 September 2012.

== Bibliography ==
- Maria Pia Gardini; Alberto Laggia, I miei anni in Scientology, Paoline editions, 2007. ISBN 978-88-315-3316-4
- Alberto Laggia, Maria Pia Gardini, Il coraggio di parlare. Storie di fuoriusciti da Scientology, Paoline editions, 2009. ISBN 978-88-315-3689-9
- Maria Pia Gardini, Maremma: Un amore proibito, Edizioni Effigi, 2011. ISBN 978-88-6433-185-0
- Maria Pia Gardini, Specchietti per allodole, Edizioni Effigi, 2012. ISBN 978-88-6433-226-0
