= Joe Habie =

José Habie Nigrin (November 14, 1956 – September 28, 2012), also known as Joe or Joey Habie, was a Guatemalan businessman of Jewish descent. He was the owner of the Liztex Corporation, one of the five largest exporters of fabrics in Latin America. He also owned the Tikal Futura business and hotel complex in Guatemala City. Habie died in a helicopter crash in Guatemala City on September 28, 2012. He was the sole occupant of the aircraft.
