= Richard Bucher =

Swiss ice hockey player

- Born: September 27, 1955; Lucerne, Switzerland
- Died: September 7, 2012 (aged 56); Zurich, Switzerland
- Height: 6 ft 1 in (185 cm)
- Weight: 185 lb (84 kg; 13 st 3 lb)
- Position: Goaltender
- Caught: Left
- Played for: HC Davos (NLA)
- National team: Switzerland
- NHL draft: Undrafted
- Playing career: 1981–1988

Richard Bucher (September 27, 1955 – September 7, 2012) was an ice hockey goaltender who played for HC Davos in the Swiss National League A. He also represented the Switzerland men's national ice hockey team in the 1985 and 1987 World Championships as well as the 1988 Winter Olympics.
