= Tikal Futura =

Shopping complex and hotel in Guatemala City, Guatemala

Coordinates: 14°37′21″N 90°33′14″W

Tikal Futura

The Tikal Futura, formally Gran Tikal Futura Torres Sol y Luna is a modern shopping and business complex and hotel in Guatemala City, Guatemala.

== Information ==
It is located at Calzada Roosevelt 22–43, in Zone 11 of the city. At 75 metres, as of 2009 it is the fourth tallest building in Guatemala City. The building covers a floor space of 193,680 m^{2}, has 20 floors and was completed in 1997. The building has 2 towers with offices, 12 cinemas, 160 stores, 27 restaurants, parking space for 1500 cars and also the Grand Tikal Futura Hotel.

== See also ==
- Joe Habie, former owner of the Tikal Futura
