= Saeed Ahmed Raipuri =

Muslim scholar

Shah Saeed Ahmed Raipuri شاہ سعید احمد رائپوری

Personal life
- Born: January 1926 Gumthala, District Karnal, India
- Died: 26 September 2012 (aged 86) Lahore, Pakistan
- Resting place: Gulzar-e-Saeedia Rahimia Near Rahimia Institute of Quranic Sciences, Lahore
- Main interest: Shah Waliullah's Philosophy
- Notable work: Social Change
- Occupation: Islamic scholar, Sufi Sheikh, author

Religious life
- Religion: Islam
- Denomination: Sunni
- Jurisprudence: Hanafi

Muslim leader
- Disciple of: Abdul Qadir Raipuri, Muhammad Ilyas Kandhalvi, Muhammad Zakariya Kandhalvi
- Influenced by: Shah Waliullah, Mahmud al-Hasan, Abdul Qadir Raipuri, Ubaidullah Sindhi, Husain Ahmad Madani
- Influenced: Mufti Abdul Khaliq Azad, Dr. Mufti Saeed-ur-Rehman Awan, Mufti Abdul Mateen Naumani

Saeed Ahmed Raipuri (Urdu: سعید احمد رائپوری, January 1926 – 26 September 2012) was a Pakistani Muslim scholar as well as the spiritual heir of Khanqah-e-Rahimia Raipur (India) and a contemporary authority of Shah Waliullah’s thought. He was among prominent disciples of Ilyas Kandhlawi, founder of Tablighi Jamaat and Zakariyya Kandhlawi. Rising above practical politics, on the basis of the thought of Shah Waliullah, Mahmud Hasan Deobandi, Abdul Qadir Raipuri, Ubaidullah Sindhi and Hussain Ahmed Madani, he established JTI in 1967. Under his supervision, a journal named "Azm (عزم)" was launched in 1974 which is still being published. In 1987, he established an organization "Tanzeem Fikr-e-Waliullahi" based on the philosophical works of Shah Waliullah. He established "Shah Waliullah Media Foundation" to publish literature based on Waliullahi philosophy. He also established Rahimia Institute of Quranic Sciences, Lahore in 2001. There are currently four other campuses of Rahimia Institute of Quranic Sciences in Karachi, Sukkur, Multan and Rawalpindi. Thousands of youth are associated with the institute through the organization of seminars and other events. In 1992, he was appointed the successor of his father Abdul Aziz Raipuri.

== Background ==
Shah Saeed Ahmed Raipuri was the eldest son of Shah Abdul Aziz Raipuri. He started to learn from Abdul Qadir Raipuri when he was 5 years old and spent thirty years of his life with him. During 1947 and 1948, he studied in Madrasa Mazahiral Uloom. Shah Saeed Ahmed Raipuri was the fourth Sheikh after Shah Abdul Rahim Raipuri (1853-1919), who was himself a Naqshbandi Pir born in Tigri, Ambala, India. Shah Abdul Rahim Raipuri established Khanqah-i-Aliya Rahimia in Raipur which, later on, became one of the leading centres of Deobandi learning. Like many of Abdul Rahim's successors, Shah Saeed Ahmed Raipuri replicated it in Lahore by the name of Idara Rahimia Ulum-i-Qurania in 2001. The network of Nizam ul Madaris ur Rahimia is very extensive with innumerable madaris (religious schools) affiliated with it throughout Pakistan.

== Contributions ==
=== Journal & Editorial Work ===
- Azm (عزم) – A theological and socio-political journal launched under his supervision in 1974. As editor, Raipuri curated articles, lectures, and research grounded in Shah Waliullahi thought.

=== Organizational & Philosophical Texts ===
- Tanzeem Fikr‑e‑Waliullahi (تَنظِیمِ فِکْرِ والِیُ اللہی) – Established in 1987, this organization produced pamphlets and booklets explaining Shah Waliullahi’s philosophy, overseen by Raipuri.
- Shah Waliullah Media Foundation Publications – Beginning in the 2000s, Raipuri’s initiative published works on Quranic sciences, Sufism, and socio-religious reform.

=== Institutional Publications & Fatwas ===
- Rahimia Institute of Quranic Sciences Journals (2001–2012)*– Under Raipuri’s leadership, the Institute released quarterly journals featuring Quranic analysis, fatwas, and spiritual essays.
- Fatwas and Public Guidance – A portfolio of fatwas on social justice, spiritual ethics, and political reform (e.g., condemning tyranny during the Afghan Jihad and anti-Shia riots), compiled in Urdu and English.

Shah Saeed Ahmed Raipuri’s work remains influential through his editorial projects and the institutions he built, particularly in advancing Shah Waliullahi thought and Sufi-based social activism in Pakistan.

== Quotes ==
He was a Muslim Sufi, scholar and thinker, known for the reformist, revolutionary and progressive ideology. Here are some of his quotes:

- If rulers are unworthy and rights of humanity violated, then work for a revolution to offset decadence.
- Allah ordered the Prophet (peace be upon him) to eradicate tyranny from society, to help oppressed people, and to free all people of the world from oppression and injustice.
- The purpose and ideology of the Quran is to worship Allah and eradicate injustice from this world and give freedom to the oppressed. It is the divine order of the Quran to eradicate poverty, establish peace, and put an end to an environment of war and fighting. It is the divine order of the Quran to fulfil the rights of your wives, children, parents, brothers and sisters, relatives, and neighbours, and going even further, the Quran enjoins upon us to fulfil the rights of all humanity.
- Namaz was supposed to create Walis. Instead, nowadays, we see that the traits of people offering the same Namaz are that of tyrants and evil doers.
- Allah says that Namaz is my right and I can forgive my right. But lying, slandering, harming others – these are the rights of the men (Haqooq-ul-Ibad).
