= C. Edwin Creed =

American football and baseball coach

- Creed pictured in The Dial 1950, Central Connecticut yearbook

Biographical details
- Born: March 5, 1921; Ashland, Missouri, U.S.
- Died: September 7, 2012 (aged 91); Palm Beach Gardens, Florida, U.S.

Coaching career (HC unless noted)

Football
- 1948–1952: Connecticut Teachers

Baseball
- 1946–1948: Connecticut Teachers

Head coaching record
- Overall: 14–18–6 (football); 24–6 (baseball)

Clark Edwin Creed (March 5, 1921 – September 7, 2012) was an American football and baseball coach. He was the second head football coach at the Teachers College of Connecticut—now known as Central Connecticut State University—serving for five seasons, from 1948 to 1952 and compiling a record of 14–18–6. Creed was also the head baseball coach at the Teachers College of Connecticut from 1946 to 1948, tallying a mark of 24–6.

Creed was born on March 5, 1921, in Ashland, Missouri. He died on September 7, 2012, in Palm Beach Gardens, Florida.

== Head coaching record ==
=== Football ===
Year	Team	Overall	Conference	Standing	Bowl/playoffs
Connecticut Teachers Blue Devils (Independent) (1948–1952)
1948	Connecticut Teachers	2–3–3			
1949	Connecticut Teachers	5–2–1			
1950	Connecticut Teachers	4–4			
1951	Connecticut Teachers	1–4–1			
1952	Connecticut Teachers	2–5–1			
Connecticut Teachers:		14–18–6			
Total:		14–18–6			
