= Plataforma per la Llengua =

Spanish Non-Government Organization

- Founded: 1993
- Type: Cultural institution
- Location(s): Sant Honorat, 7; 08002 Barcelona Catalonia
- Region served: Catalan-speaking territories
- Members: 26,000
- Website: plataforma-llengua.cat

Catalan-speaking territories

Plataforma per la Llengua (literally: Platform for the Language) is a non-governmental organization founded in Barcelona in 1993, which seeks to defend and extend the use and presence of the Catalan language, to defend the linguistic rights of Catalan speakers, and to promote the broader use of the language as a tool of social cohesion across all the territories where it is spoken.

Their activities include campaigns promoting the use of Catalan in various domains of society and the economy, in the media, in universities and the education sector, in public administration, and as part of the process of absorption and integration of new immigrants.

While based in Barcelona, it has delegations in the Valencian Community, Alghero and in several Catalan-speaking regions. Plataforma per la Llengua also works together with local organisations in Northern Catalonia, La Franja, Andorra and Balearic Islands.

As of 2025, the Platform had over 26,000 members, over 95,000 followers on Facebook and over 70,000 followers on Twitter.

The Platform publishes a biannual journal titled La Corbella, through which the organisation spreads news about its latest activities and campaigns, as well as featuring opinion pieces on issues of sociolinguistic concern. In 2008, the Federació d'Ateneus de Catalunya (FAC, Federation of Cultural Associations of Catalonia) awarded La Corbella the prize for the best media outlet of any of its constituent cultural associations.

== Mission ==
The objectives of Plataforma per la Llengua, as defined by the organisation itself, are:

- To ensure that Catalan becomes the common language, the language of social cohesion and of interaction between all people within the Catalan linguistic area;
- To guarantee and promote the use of the Catalan language across all domains and registers of use, such that it can be used in all of them in a fully-fledged capacity;
- To defend the linguistic and cultural rights of people who speak Catalan and of people who live in Catalan-speaking territories;
- To both lead and collaborate on campaigns for the linguistic normalisation of the Catalan language;
- To take an active interest in the issues affecting Catalan society, as and when they might contribute to the improvement of the use of the Catalan language.

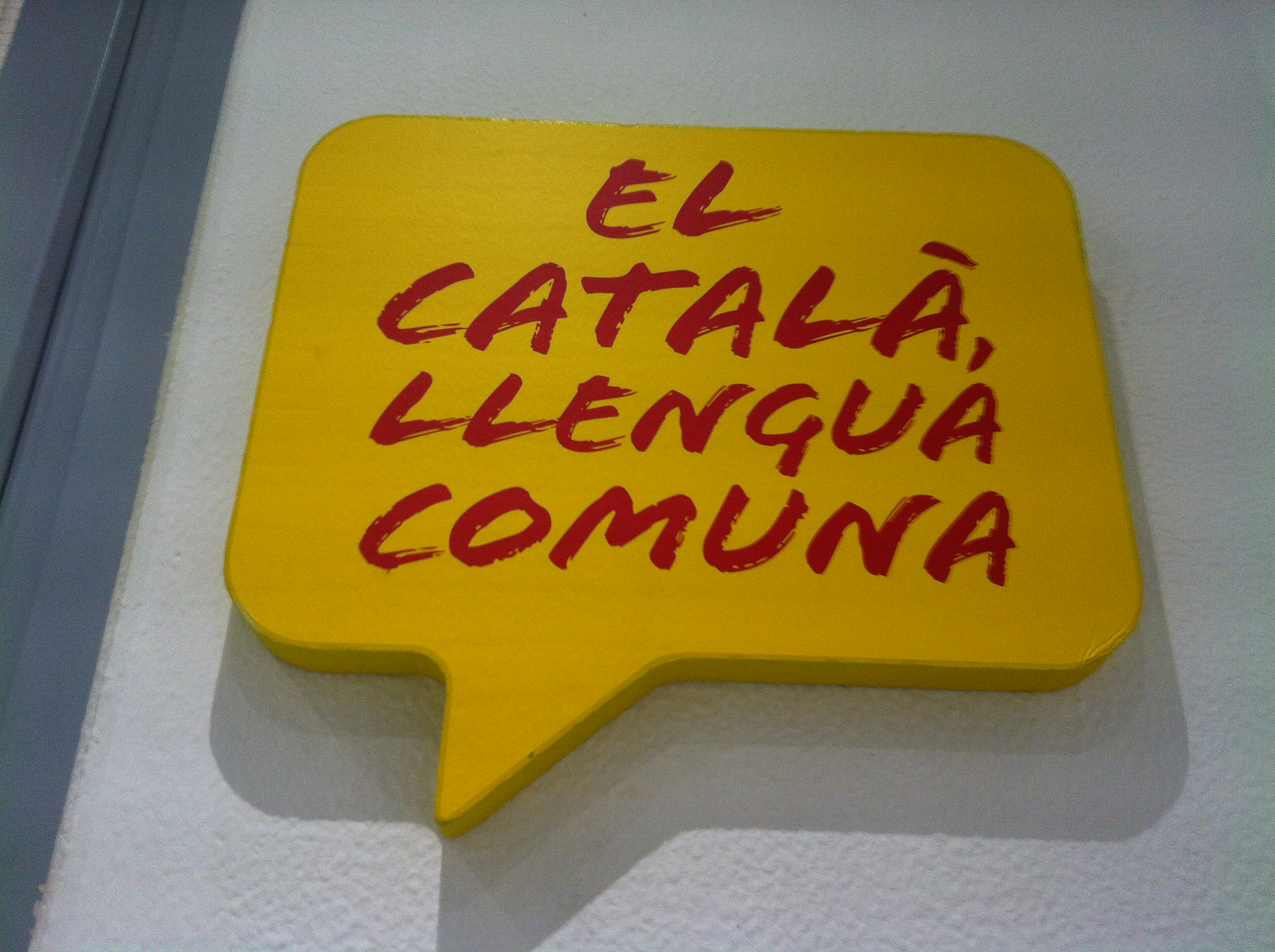
Wall sign depicting the slogan of Plataforma per la Llengua, "El català, llengua comuna" (in English, "Catalan, shared language")

== Activities ==
The Platform aims to work within the following areas of priority:

- Linguistic Awareness-Raising: Campaigns promoting the use of the Catalan language in general, and sensitising the population around the use of the language.
- Integration and Social Cohesion: Promotion of the use of Catalan as a tool of integration for immigrants and new arrivals in Catalan-speaking regions.
- Linguistic Rights and Public Administration: Campaigns seeking to defend and extend legal and political recognition of Catalan and the right of speakers to use the language, particularly within public institutions.
- Culture, Leisure and Youth: Encouragement and development of strategies to extend and normalise the use of Catalan in audiovisual media, leisure, toys and games, and various areas of interest to young people.
- Education and University: Work to ensure that Catalan is both the language of instruction and of communication amongst peers in schools and universities in all Catalan-speaking territories.
- Business and Consumer Goods: Defence of consumer rights to receive products and services in Catalan, and action to increase the prevalence of Catalan in packaging, signage, promotional materials, websites and digital services.
- Justice: Campaigns to increase the use of Catalan within the justice system, and defence of the linguistic rights of Catalan speakers to use their language in this domain without discrimination.
- International: Activities to promote awareness and recognition of Catalan abroad, and to collaborate internationally on issues of minority language rights. This includes an ongoing campaign to make Catalan an official language of the EU.

== History ==
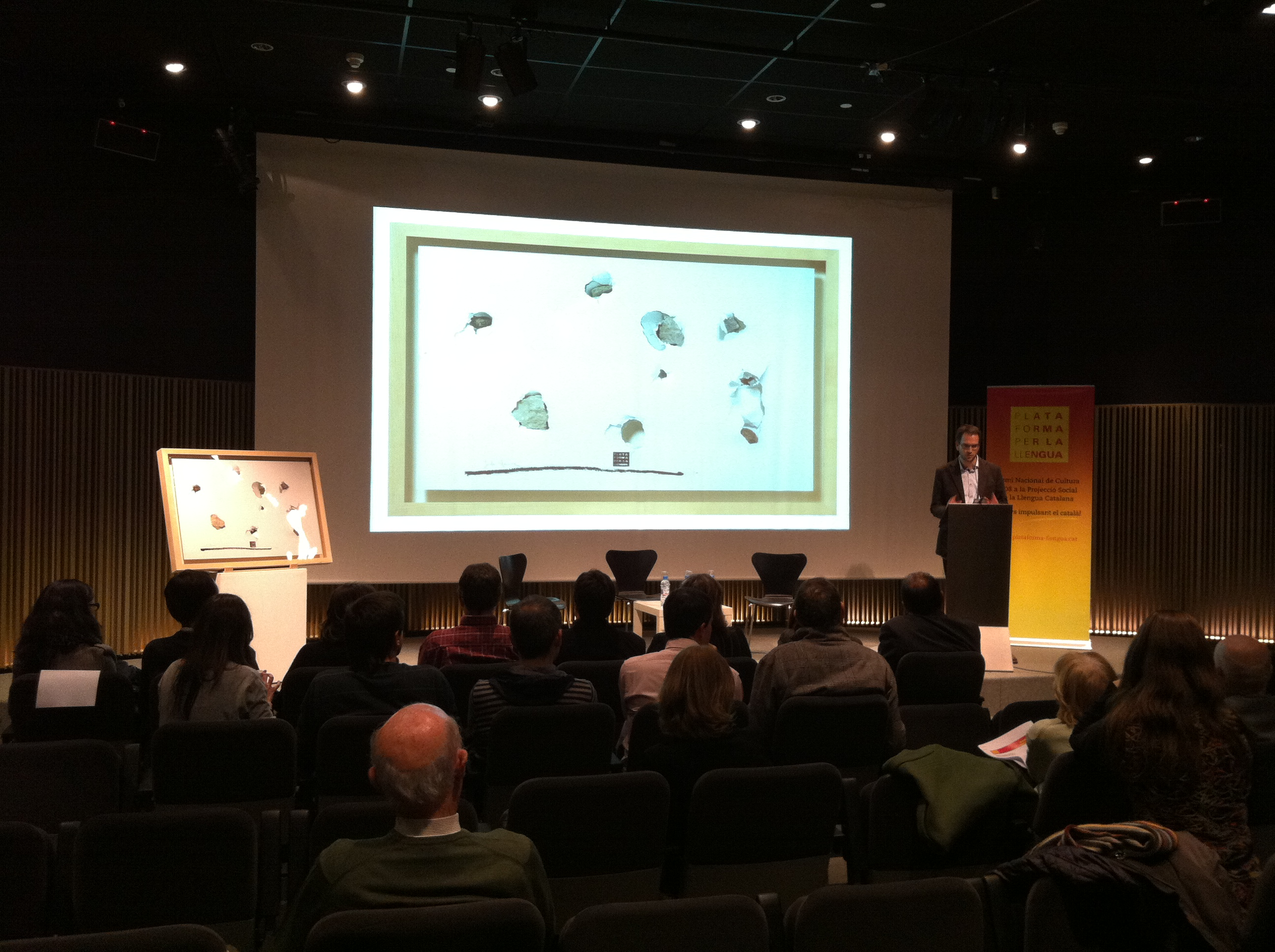
Plataforma per la llengua. Act at MACBA Barcelona

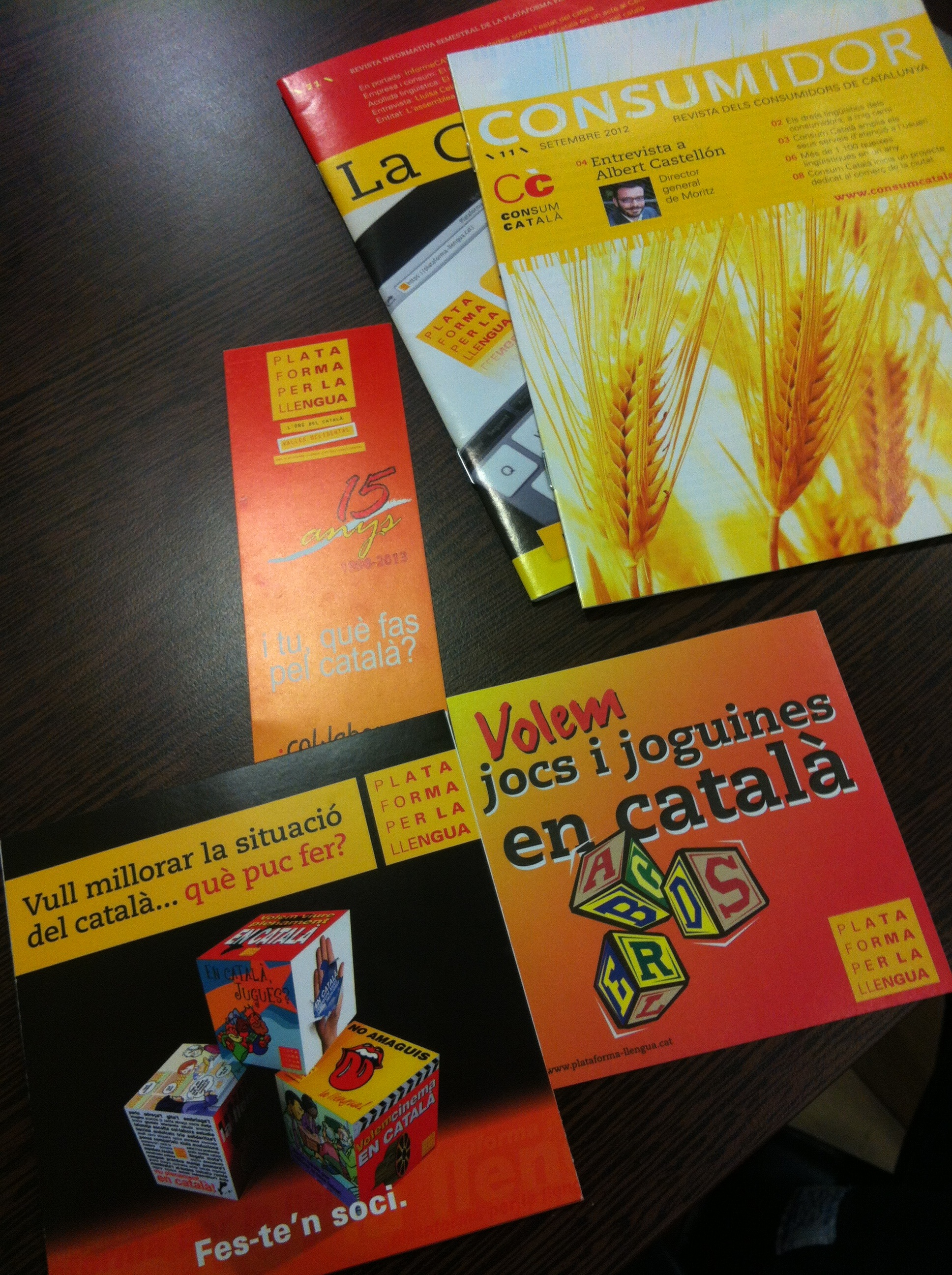
Magazines Plataforma per la Llengua

=== Formation ===
Plataforma per la Llengua was formed in 1993 by a group of young people from the L'Esbarzer Co-operative, a local housing and citizens' rights initiative in Barcelona. The group's first significant action was a symbolic act of public protest against the lack of product labelling in Catalan on consumer goods produced by Coca-Cola and other large multinationals. The association collected 18,000 Coca-Cola cans which were donated by members of the public at collection points throughout Barcelona, and in December 1993 these were then all piled up in one place, in Plaça de Catalunya, and arranged by members of the public to spell out the words "Etiquetem en català" (English: Let's label in Catalan). The goal was raise awareness of this issue, to pressure companies to change their practices, and to encourage public bodies in Catalonia to only purchase products labelled in Catalan.

The organisation was initially endorsed by a consultative council consisting of Salvador Cardús, Jordi Font, Josep M. López Llaví, Albert Manent, Isidor Marí, Fèlix Martí, Jordi Porta, Jordi Sànchez, Josep M. Terricabras, Miquel Sellarès, Vicenç Villatoro, Isabel-Clara Simó, Miquel Strubell, Patrícia Gabancho and Abelard Saragossà.

=== Early campaigns ===
Between 1995 and 2000 various acts of protest took place in cinemas to ask for dubbing and subtitling of films in Catalan. Also during this period, there were campaigns by the Platform to pressure the government and relevant multinationals through public information campaigns and press releases to the media on the issue of the use of Catalan in cinema. In 2001, representatives of the Platform protested inside Warner cinemas in Catalonia as a result of the company's decision not to dub Harry Potter and the Philosopher's Stone into Catalan. In 2010, Plataforma per la Llengua successfully pressured the Catalan government to write a law on cinema that guarantees that 50% of films shown in cinemas in Catalonia are either dubbed or subtitled in Catalan. However, the law has been marked by a lack of enforcement, limiting its real-world impact on the linguistic situation in cinema in Catalonia.

The Platform has also played a key role in discussions leading to other laws implemented by the Generalitat de Catalunya, including the 1998 law on linguistic policy, the 2006 Statute of Autonomy of Catalonia, the 2010 law on reception of immigrants to Catalonia, and the 2010 Code on Consumer Rights. The Platform was able to win small concessions in areas affecting language policy, although the application of these has proven difficult. In the corporate sphere, the linguistic situation of Catalan was still weak in the year 2000, some notable wins were subsequently achieved regarding the inclusion and use of the Catalan language by big multinationals like Apple, Microsoft, Vodafone, Orange, Telefónica, Carrefour, Nokia, Samsung, Siemens, Carrefour, and Decathlon.

=== Consolidation as an organisation ===
From 2000, Plataforma per la Llengua started growing from a small organisation primarily supported by the l’Esbarzer Collective into something with a professional organisational structure and a solid base of members. Further, the Platform began to organise annual events in order to raise awareness among members of the public about their linguistic rights, and to demand improvements in the use of Catalan in business as well as in the autonomous governments of Catalonia, Valencia, Aragon and the Balearic Islands and at the nation state level in Spain, France and Italy.

Shortly before Christmas 2004, the Platform organised the first annual Festival for Games and Toys in Catalan (Festa per al joc i la joguina en català). Since then, it has been held once a year and is used as a platform to raise awareness for the organisation's demand that children should have access to toys and games with content and instructions in Catalan. In 2005, the first Welcome Fair for Erasmus Students (Festa d’Acollida d’Estudiants Universitaris Erasmus) took place in Barcelona with the aim of encouraging the learning of Catalan by Erasmus exchange students, increasing their awareness of the language, and promoting the use of the language in university courses. On Diada de Sant Jordi 2005, in what would become yet another annual event, the Platform organised a large gathering in Plaça de Catalunya together with immigrant organizations in order to raise awareness among newcomers to the country about the role of the Catalan language as a tool for social integration. Since then, the organization has worked together with some 30 immigrant organizations to encourage the use of Catalan as a cohesion tool, working to pair up learners with Catalan speakers willing to help them learn, and also producing viral video content promoting Catalan as a common language.

Following the 1998 Law on Catalan language policy, and building on their early campaigns around consumer goods labelling, the Platform brought together hundreds of local government authorities and institutions committed to only purchasing products labelled in Catalan. The campaign culminated in 2010 with the declaration of the "Girona Agreement" (Compromís de Girona), which hundreds of local authorities signed, calling on the Catalan Parliament to legislate on this issue. After some wins in getting labelling in Catalan onto wine, water, milk and beer products, and following years of intense campaigning by the Platform, the Consumer Code of Catalonia Law was finally passed in 2010, including a provision obligating labelling in Catalan for products distributed in Catalonia.

The Platform has mounted campaigns on a number of occasions denouncing the lack of official status for Catalan in the European Union, noting that it is by far the largest language by number of speakers in Europe which lacks official status at either the nation state or European level. The organisation has produced videos in English explaining this, and has sent delegations to Brussels to lobby on this issue and on other issues concerning the linguistic rights of Catalan speakers.

The Platform has also raised concerns about linguistic discrimination against Catalan speakers from the Spanish government, particularly within the justice system in Catalonia.

=== Death of Martí Gasull i Roig and 20th anniversary ===
On 23 September 2012, Martí Gasull i Roig, one of the organisation's founders and leaders, died in a mountaineering accident on Manaslu, Nepal. In recognition of his work for the Catalan language, the Generalitat de Catalunya posthumously awarded him with the Creu de Sant Jordi. He received a number of other posthumous prizes, and on 15 January 2013, Plataforma per la Llengua honoured the life of Martí Gasull Roig in a celebration at the Sala Gran del Teatre Nacional de Catalunya in Barcelona. The Platform also announced the creation of the Martí Gasull i Roig Prize, which is awarded annually to a person or organization which has played an exemplary role in the defence or promotion of the Catalan language.

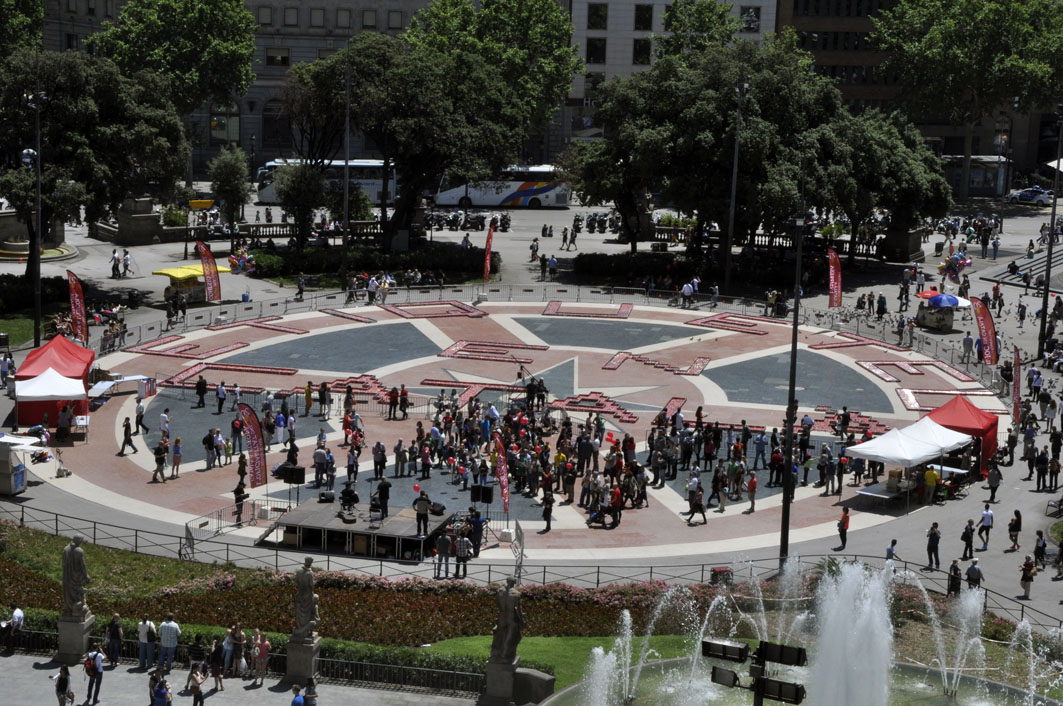
40,000 Coca-Cola cans form a mosaic reading, "Etiqueteu en català" (Label in Catalan)

The organisation celebrated its 20th anniversary in 2014 with a number of public actions and campaigns. Recalling its inaugural action in December 1993, the Platform returned to Plaça de Catalunya in May 2014 with more than 40,000 Coca-Cola cans, using them to spell out "Etiqueteu en català!" (Label [products] in Catalan!) in large letters on the floor. The objective of this was to convince large companies to label their products in Catalan and comply with the laws and requirements now in force in this regard. In this vein, the Platform also called on the government to enforce the law and guarantee product labelling in Catalan. In the same year, a book was also published on the history of the organisation by writer and historian Francesc Marco i Palau.

In 2022, Plataforma per la Llengua organised the first annual SAGA Gaming Convention (SAGA, Saló del Gaming), which aims to promote video games published in Catalan.

== Awards ==
Over the years, the Platform has received a number of awards, including the 2008 National Culture Award for the Social Promotion of the Catalan Language, given by the Generalitat de Catalunya; the Abacus Prize, awarded in 2010; the Volunteering Prize in 2008, 2010 and 2012, and the Prize for the Best Project Community Project Award from the National Youth Council of Catalonia, awarded in 2011.
