= Nikodimos of Ierissos =

Nikodimos Anagnostou (Greek: Νικόδημος Αναγνώστου; September 7, 1931, Ierissos – September 16, 2012, Arnaia) was a Greek Orthodox bishop of Ierissos from 1981 to 2012.

He graduated with honors from the Theological School of Halki in 1955, and in the same year he was ordained a Deacon and then an Presbyter in the Theological School of Halki by the Headmaster of the School, Bishop of Konya, Iakovos.

On 29 March 1981, he was ordained Metropolitan of Yerisovo and Ardameri in the Church of Saint Nicholas in Kato Patisia. The ordination was performed by Archbishop Seraphim of Athens, in conjunction with Metropolitans Jacob of Mytilene, Maxim of Stavropol, Barnabas of Kitros and Katerin, Athanasius of Ilia, Ambrose of Polen and Kukushki, Agathangelus of Dimotishki, Panteleimon of Samos and Ikaria, Panteleimon of Zakynthos and Jacob of Kithira.
