= Rakitha Wimaladarma =

Sri Lankan cricketer (1984–2012)

Personal information
- Full name: Weliwitagoda Rakitha Dilshan Wimaladarma
- Born: 20 November 1984; Colombo, Sri Lanka
- Died: 29 September 2012 (aged 27); Colombo, Sri Lanka
- Batting: Right-handed
- Bowling: Right arm Offbreak
- Source: ESPNcricinfo, 23 June 2016

Weliwitagoda Rakitha Dilshan Wimaladarma (20 November 1984 – 29 September 2012) was a Sri Lankan cricketer. He played 28 first-class matches for several domestic teams in Sri Lanka between 2004 and 2012.
