= Stephen Paul (physicist) =

Stephen F. Paul
- Born: November 13, 1953
- Died: September 15, 2012 (aged 58)
- Citizenship: United States (1953–2012)
- Education: BS from Cornell University, BS (applied physics); Columbia University, MS, PhD (plasma physics)
- Known for: P-series fuels; processing organic waste for fuel; converting sludge
- Scientific career
- Fields: Physics, Chemistry
- Workplaces: Princeton Plasma Physics Laboratory at Princeton University
- Doctoral advisor: Prof. Bob Gross
- Notable students

Stephen F. Paul (November 13, 1953 – September 15, 2012) was a physicist at the Princeton Plasma Physics Laboratory at Princeton University. He created and patented the P-series fuels, a new, liquid, renewable, non-petroleum gasoline formulation. He was in the process of converting an unused sludge plant in Trenton, NJ to process organic waste for fuel before he died.

He lived in New Jersey with his wife. He had three grown children.

He had a BS from Cornell University and received his master's degree and PhD from Columbia University.

== See also ==
- P-series fuels
