= Wilfried Bode =

German water polo player

Personal information
- Nationality: German
- Born: 13 December 1929; Hanover, Germany
- Died: 25 September 2012 (aged 82); Garbsen, Germany

Sport
- Sport: Water polo

Wilfried Bode (13 December 1929 – 25 September 2012) was a German water polo player. He competed at the 1952 Summer Olympics and the 1956 Summer Olympics.
