= Donald Gregg (cricketer) =

Australian cricketer

Personal information
- Full name: Donald Malcolm Gregg
- Born: 17 September 1924; Tumby Bay, South Australia
- Died: 26 September 2012 (aged 88)
- Batting: Left-handed
- Bowling: Right-arm fast-medium
- Source: ESPNcricinfo, 24 June 2016

Donald Gregg (17 September 1924 – 26 September 2012) was an Australian cricketer. He played fifteen first-class matches for South Australia between 1954 and 1957.
