= Keith Lewis (Australian cricketer) =

Australian cricketer

Personal information
- Born: 4 February 1923; Adelaide, Australia
- Died: 12 September 2012 (aged 89)
- Source: Cricinfo, 12 August 2020

Keith Lewis (4 February 1923 – 12 September 2012) was an Australian cricketer. He played in eight first-class matches for South Australia between 1948 and 1950.

== See also ==
- List of South Australian representative cricketers
