= Reubin Andres =

American gerontologist

Reubin Andres (June 13, 1923 – September 23, 2012) was an American gerontologist.

== Early life and education ==
Reubin Andres was born on June 13, 1923 in Dallas, Texas in a Yiddish-speaking family. He initially attended Southern Methodist University but left in 1941 due to religious constraints. Despite this, he was admitted to Southwestern Medical School, graduating at the age of 21. Concurrently, he served in the U.S. Army in Korea and Japan, tasked with controlling malaria and venereal diseases, and contracted malaria himself.

== Career ==
Andres moved to Baltimore for research at Johns Hopkins University. In the late 1950s, he joined the Gerontology Research Center, which later became the National Institute on Aging, at the request of Nathan Shock.

== Research ==
Andres proposed the theory that older adults could potentially benefit from gradual weight gain, which contradicted the prevailing view on maintaining a consistent weight throughout adulthood. The theory continues to be debated, despite some supporting studies, as the National Institute of Health maintains its differing stance.

In the field of diabetes research, Andres developed the glucose insulin clamp technique, a method for accurately manipulating insulin and glucose levels. This tool has been used in the investigation of new interventions for Type 2 diabetes. In recognition of his work, he was awarded the Albert Renold Award from the American Diabetes Association in 2000.
