= Martí Gasull i Roig =

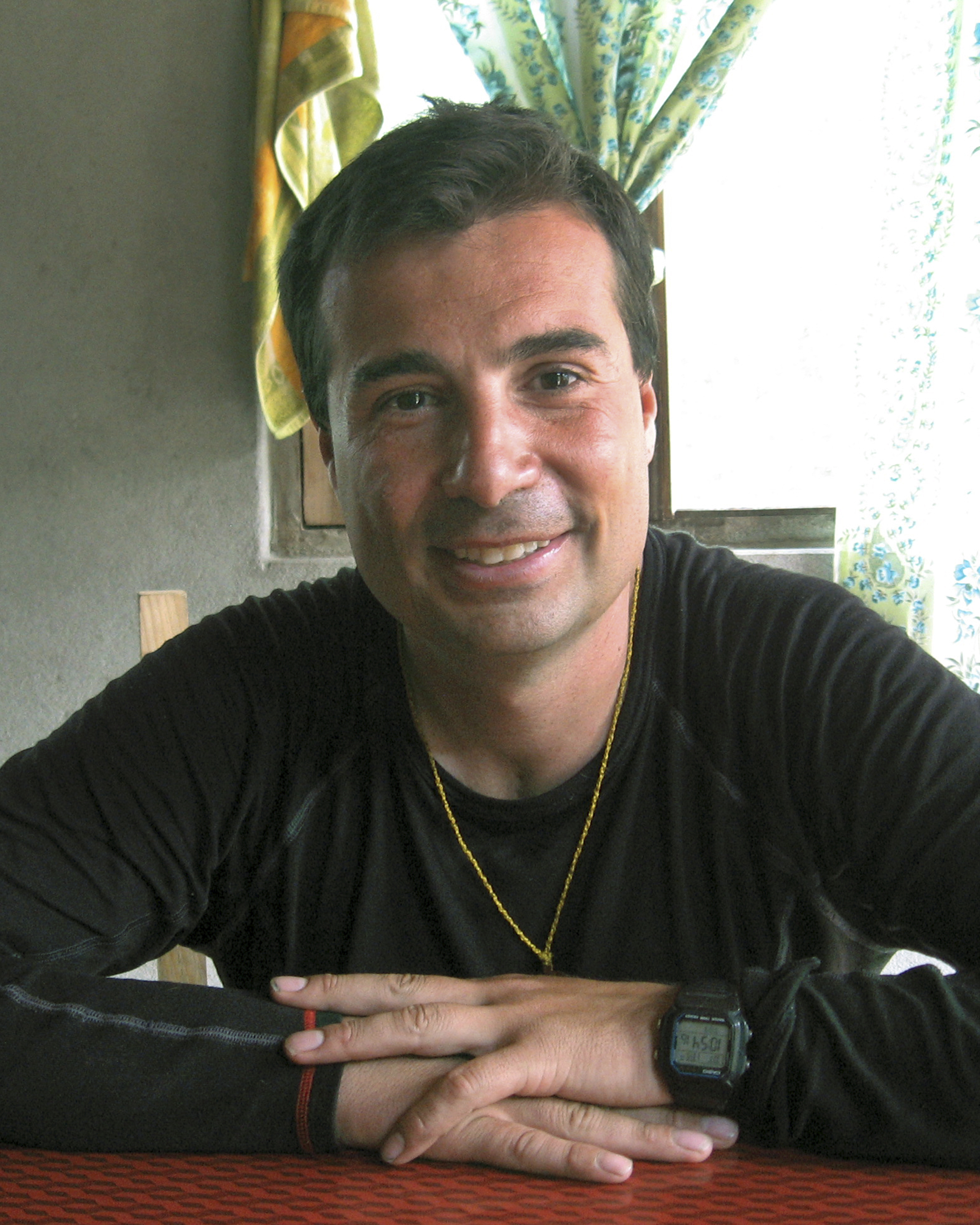
- Born: 2 April 1969; Barcelona, Catalonia
- Died: 23 September 2012 (aged 43); Manaslu, Nepal

Martí Gasull i Roig (Barcelona, Catalonia, 2 April 1969 - Manaslu, Nepal, 23 September 2012) was a Catalan linguistic activist and a mountaineer, one of the founders of the Platform for the Catalan Language (Plataforma per la Llengua). He was fully involved in the organisation's coordination, becoming its ideologist. He combined his love for the Catalan language and culture with his great passion for mountaineering. On 23 September 2012, he died in an accident on Manaslu in Nepal. Martí Gasull i Roig work’s has been appreciated many times. The Government of Catalonia (Generalitat de Catalunya) posthumously awarded him the Cross of St George (Creu de Sant Jordi) on 9 October 2012. Barcelona City Council posthumously awarded him the Gold Medal for Cultural Merit on 18 December 2013. The Platform for the Catalan Language (Plataforma per la Llengua) created an award bearing his name that is given out annually to individuals and associations that work, as Martí did, tirelessly on behalf of the Catalan language.
