= Robert Morgan Fink =

American biochemist

- Born: September 22, 1915; Greenville, Illinois
- Died: September 5, 2012 (aged 96)
- Education: University of Rochester
- Scientific career
- Fields: Nuclear medicine
- Workplaces: University of California, Los Angeles

Robert Morgan Fink (1915-2012) was an American biochemist who was a professor at University of California, Los Angeles. He and his wife Kathryn Ferguson Fink, also a biochemist, collaborated to develop techniques in nuclear medicine used for radiolabeling in the study of thyroid cancer treatment.

== Early life and education ==
Fink was born in Greenville, Illinois in 1915 as one of six children. He was an undergraduate first at Kansas State College and later at the University of Illinois, from which he graduated in 1937; he then did some graduate work at Lehigh University and received his PhD from the University of Rochester in 1942. During his graduate studies he met his fellow graduate student and future wife Kathryn Ferguson Fink. The couple married in 1941 and both did work with Stafford Warren supported by the Manhattan Project after finishing their PhDs. In 1946 Fink was sent to Bikini Atoll for studies of radiation safety related to ongoing nuclear testing there.

== Academic career ==
Fink briefly held a faculty appointment at the University of Rochester during his Manhattan Project-related work, in which he performed experiments related to metabolism of radioactive elements, particularly polonium, in at least one case on terminally ill human patients in order to obtain data used to develop related occupational safety standards. Although they did not meet modern standards of informed consent, the report of these experiments has been noted as unusual in discussing the matter of consent with the subjects.

When Stafford Warren moved to UCLA to become the dean of the newly established medical school there, the Finks joined him in 1947, with Robert taking a position in the UCLA biochemistry department and Kathryn working at the medical school, where she would eventually become the first PhD (rather than MD) holder to be appointed as a professor of medicine. The couple published extensively together about the use of radiolabeling with paper chromatography techniques for the study of metabolic pathways. These tools were applied to the study of chemotherapy in thyroid cancers. Fink retired from UCLA in 1978.

== Personal life ==
Fink and his wife Kathryn had two daughters. Kathryn died of cancer in 1989. Robert Fink died in 2012.
