= Diocese of Chartres =

Latin Catholic territory in France

Coordinates: 48°26′51″N 1°29′23″E

Diocese of Chartres Dioecesis Carnutensis Diocèse de Chartres

Catholic
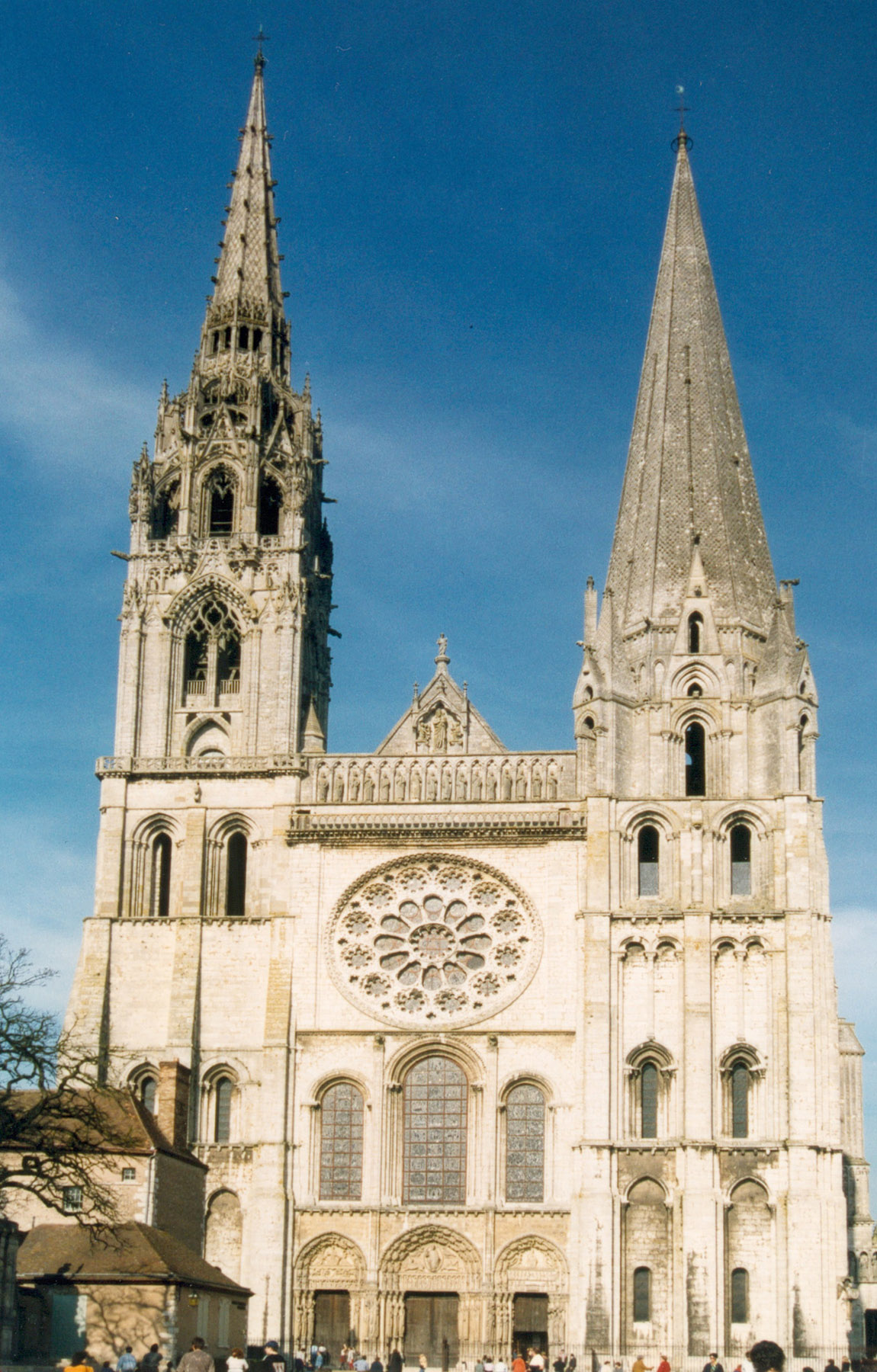
- Chartres Cathedral

Location
- Country: France
- Ecclesiastical province: Tours
- Metropolitan: Archdiocese of Tours

Statistics
- Area: 5,939 km^{2} (2,293 sq mi)
- Population: Total; Catholics: (as of 2021); 432,107; 286,850 (66.4%)
- Parishes: 23

Information
- Denomination: Catholic Church
- Sui iuris church: Latin Church
- Rite: Roman Rite
- Established: 3rd Century
- Cathedral: Cathedral Basilica of Notre Dame in Chartres
- Patron saint: Assumption of Mary
- Secular priests: 53 (Diocesan); 12 (Religious Orders); 29 Permanent Deacons

Current leadership
- Pope: Leo XIV
- Bishop: Philippe Christory
- Metropolitan Archbishop: Vincent Jordy

Map

Website
- diocesechartres.fr

The Diocese of Chartres (Latin: Dioecesis Carnutensis; French: Diocèse de Chartres) is Catholic Church ecclesiastical territory or diocese of the Catholic Church in France. Currently, the diocese covered the department of Eure-et-Loir as well as four parishes located in the department of Eure.

The diocese is a suffragan in the ecclesiastical province of the metropolitan Archdiocese of Tours.

In 2021, in the Diocese of Chartres, there was one priest for every 4,413 Catholics.

== History ==
Adventus is listed as the first bishop. Solemnis was instrumental in the conversion of Clovis. In 911, Bishop Gauscelinus used the Voile de la Vierge (Veil of the Blessed Virgin), as a standard when warding off the invading Normans. Fulbert was responsible for the advancement of the Nativity of the Virgin's feast day on September 8. Ivo of Chartres and John of Salisbury were notable bishops.

The Cathédrale Notre-Dame de Chartres was constructed between 1194 and 1220, on the site of at least five cathedrals that have occupied the site since the Diocese of Chartres was formed as an episcopal see in the 4th century.

In 1697, the Diocese of Blois was erected from the territory of Chartres. It 1802, the Diocese of Chartres was suppressed, and the area placed under the newly created Diocese of Versailles. However, in 1822, the See of Chartres was re-established and made suffragan at that time to the Archbishopric of Paris.

== Pilgrimages ==
Chartres has been a site of Christian pilgrimage since the Middle Ages. Louis IX of France made a pilgrimage; as did Philip IV and Charles IV.

The poet Charles Péguy (1873–1914) revived the pilgrimage route between Paris and Chartres before the First World War. After the war, some students carried on the pilgrimage in his memory. Since the 1980s, the association Notre-Dame de Chrétienté, with offices in Versailles, has organized the annual 100-km pilgrimage on foot from the cathedral of Notre-Dame de Paris to the cathedral of Notre-Dame de Chartres. About 15,000 pilgrims, mostly young families from all over France, participate every year.

== See also ==
- Catholic Church in France

== Bibliography ==
=== Reference works ===
- Gams, Pius Bonifatius (1873). Series episcoporum Ecclesiae catholicae: quotquot innotuerunt a beato Petro apostolo. Ratisbon: Typis et Sumptibus Georgii Josephi Manz. (Use with caution; obsolete)
- Eubel, Conradus, ed. (1913). Hierarchia catholica, Tomus 1 (second ed.). Münster: Libreria Regensbergiana. (in Latin)
- Eubel, Conradus, ed. (1914). Hierarchia catholica, Tomus 2 (second ed.). Münster: Libreria Regensbergiana. (in Latin)
- Eubel, Conradus; Gulik, Guilelmus (1923). Hierarchia catholica, Tomus 3 (second ed.). Münster: Libreria Regensbergiana.
- Gauchat, Patritius (Patrice) (1935). Hierarchia catholica IV (1592-1667). Münster: Libraria Regensbergiana.
- Ritzler, Remigius; Sefrin, Pirminus (1952). Hierarchia catholica medii et recentis aevi V (1667-1730). Patavii: Messagero di S. Antonio.
- Ritzler, Remigius; Sefrin, Pirminus (1958). Hierarchia catholica medii et recentis aevi VI (1730-1799). Patavii: Messagero di S. Antonio.
- Ritzler, Remigius; Sefrin, Pirminus (1968). Hierarchia Catholica medii et recentioris aevi sive summorum pontificum, S. R. E. cardinalium, ecclesiarum antistitum series... A pontificatu Pii PP. VII (1800) usque ad pontificatum Gregorii PP. XVI (1846) (in Latin). Vol. VII. Monasterii: Libr. Regensburgiana.
- Remigius Ritzler; Pirminus Sefrin (1978). Hierarchia catholica Medii et recentioris aevi... A Pontificatu PII PP. IX (1846) usque ad Pontificatum Leonis PP. XIII (1903) (in Latin). Vol. VIII. Il Messaggero di S. Antonio.
- Pięta, Zenon (2002). Hierarchia catholica medii et recentioris aevi... A pontificatu Pii PP. X (1903) usque ad pontificatum Benedictii PP. XV (1922) (in Latin). Vol. IX. Padua: Messagero di San Antonio. ISBN 978-88-250-1000-8.

=== Studies ===
- Du Tems, Hugues (1774). Le clergé de France, ou tableau historique et chronologique des archevêques, évêques, abbés, abbesses et chefs des chapitres principaux du royaume, depuis la fondation des églises jusqu'à nos jours (in French). Vol. Tome premier. Paris: Delalain.
- Jean, Armand (1891). Les évêques et les archevêques de France depuis 1682 jusqu'à 1801 (in French). Paris: A. Picard.
- Société bibliographique (France) (1907). L'épiscopat français depuis le Concordat jusqu'à la Séparation (1802-1905). Paris: Librairie des Saints-Pères. pp. 346–350.
