= Luigi Biraghi =

Italian Roman Catholic priest

Blessed Luigi Biraghi
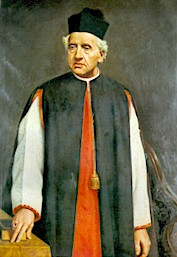
- Born: 2 November 1801; Vignate, Milan, Italian Republic
- Died: 11 August 1879 (aged 77); Milan, Kingdom of Italy
- Venerated in: Roman Catholic Church
- Beatified: 30 April 2006, Milan, Italy by Cardinal Jose Saraiva Martins
- Feast: 28 May

Luigi Biraghi (2 November 1801 – 11 August 1879) was an Italian Roman Catholic priest who served in his home of Milan. Biraghi later went on to establish his own religious congregation known as the Sisters of Saint Marcellina.

Biraghi served as a teacher and a spiritual director, and he served as a spiritual guide for fellow priests as well as bishops and seminarians. He was also appointed to the Biblioteca Ambrosiana and cultivated vast histories of ecclesiastical events and theological matters. He established his new order with the objective of catering to the educational needs of all people.

He was beatified on 30 April 2006 in Milan after the recognition of a miracle attributed to him and as well as for his model and austere life that he led.

== Life ==
Luigi Biraghi was born in Milan on 2 November 1801 as the fifth of eight children to Francesco Biraghi and Maria Fini, who were both farmers. He was baptised on 3 November.

He commenced his studies for the priesthood at the age of twelve and studied in both Milan and Monza in the Major Seminaries located there. He studied the humanities as well as both philosophical and theological studies. He was ordained to the priesthood on 28 May 1825 in the Duomo and was assigned to teach at the seminaries of Castello sopra Lecco and Seveso. He gained a deep reputation as an educated and cultured man with an intimate knowledge of the Church Fathers. He also served as a spiritual director in Milan in 1833. He became close friends with Angelo Ramazzotti.

Biragi - with the aid of Mariana Videmari - established in 1836 the Sisters of Saint Marcellina with the aim of the education of girls and help to the poor. He was named as a doctor of the Biblioteca Ambrosiana in 1855 and was made a canon of the Basilica of Saint Ambrose sometime after. In 1862 - at the personal request of Pope Pius IX - he acted as a mediator among those in the Milanese church: two groups were split over a unified state and those that desired the continuation of the Papal States. He was appointed as the Vice-Prefect of the Biblioteca Ambrosiana in 1864 and made a Domestic Prelate - or Monsignor - in 1873. He was well known to the pope, who held him in such high esteem.

His health started to decline in 1879, and he died on the morning of 11 August 1879. His order flourished outside of Milan, where he died, to places such as France and Canada, amongst other places. He was buried alongside relatives in Cernusco sul Naviglio and his relics were translated in 1951 to the Mother House of the order.

== Beatification ==
The process for beatification had commenced on 27 October 1971 under Cardinal Giovanni Colombo in Milan despite the fact that formal assent to commence the cause was not granted until 26 June 1981, which granted him the posthumous title Servant of God. The local process saw the accumulation of documents relevant to the life of Biraghi and received its ratification in 1993.

The Positio was submitted to the Congregation for the Causes of Saints in Rome in 1995 for further evaluation and allowed for Pope John Paul II to declare him to be Venerable on 20 December 2003 after recognizing that he had lived a life of heroic virtue.

The miracle needed for beatification was investigated and ratified on 24 March 1999, and from there proceeded to Rome for careful inspection. John Paul II approved the miracle on 20 December 2004, which allowed for him to be beatified under his successor Pope Benedict XVI on 30 April 2006. Cardinal Jose Saraiva Martins presided over the beatification.
