= Heri Bert Bartscht =

American sculptor (1919–1996)

- Born: 1919; Breslau, Germany
- Died: 1996 (aged 76–77); Dallas, Texas, U.S.
- Education: Academy of Fine Arts, Munich
- Occupations: Sculptor, educator

Heri Bert Bartscht (1919–1996) was a German-born American sculptor and educator. Born in Breslau and trained at the Academy of Fine Arts, Munich, he taught at the University of Dallas for 29 years, where he established the Sculpture Department. According to the Irving Daily News, "His works are done in the traditional materials such as wood, stone, copper, mosaic or welded or forged steel and in the age-old technique or bronze-casting."
