= Frank Lazarus =

American university president

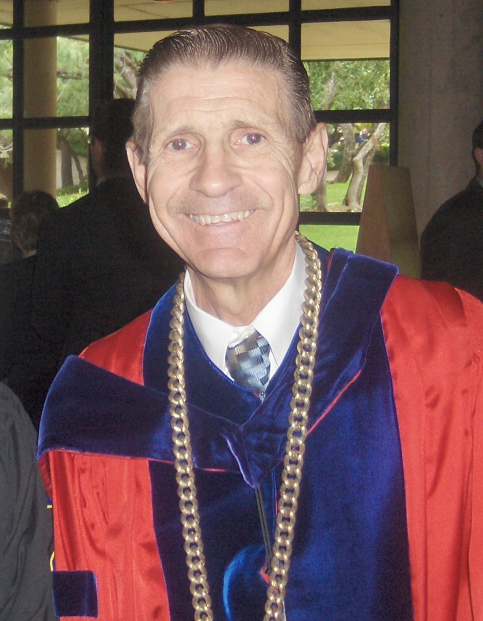
- Lazarus in 2008
- Born: 1944 (age 81–82); Elma, New York
- Occupations: Retired educator and higher education administrator
- Years active: 2004–2009
- Known for: President of the University of Dallas in Irving, Texas

Francis M. "Frank" Lazarus (born 1944) is an American retired educator and higher education administrator. He served as the president of the University of Dallas in Irving, Texas, from 2004 to 2009, when he was honored by the board of trustees with the title of president emeritus.

== Biography ==
Lazarus was born in Elma, New York, in 1944. He is married to the former Carol Scheminger, whom he met in third grade. They have three children and nine grandchildren.

=== Education and degrees ===
Lazarus earned the Bachelor of Arts (A.B., 1966) degree from Canisius College in Buffalo, New York, where he graduated summa cum laude with concentrations in classical languages and philosophy. He was awarded the college's Distinguished Alumni Award in 2005.

He also holds the Master of Arts (M.A., 1968) degree and the Doctor of Philosophy (Ph.D., 1972) degree in classical languages from Cornell University. His areas of specialty are Latin and Greek literature of the Classical period and Greek archaeology.

He is a member of Phi Beta Kappa and Alpha Sigma Nu, the national Jesuit honor society.

=== Career ===
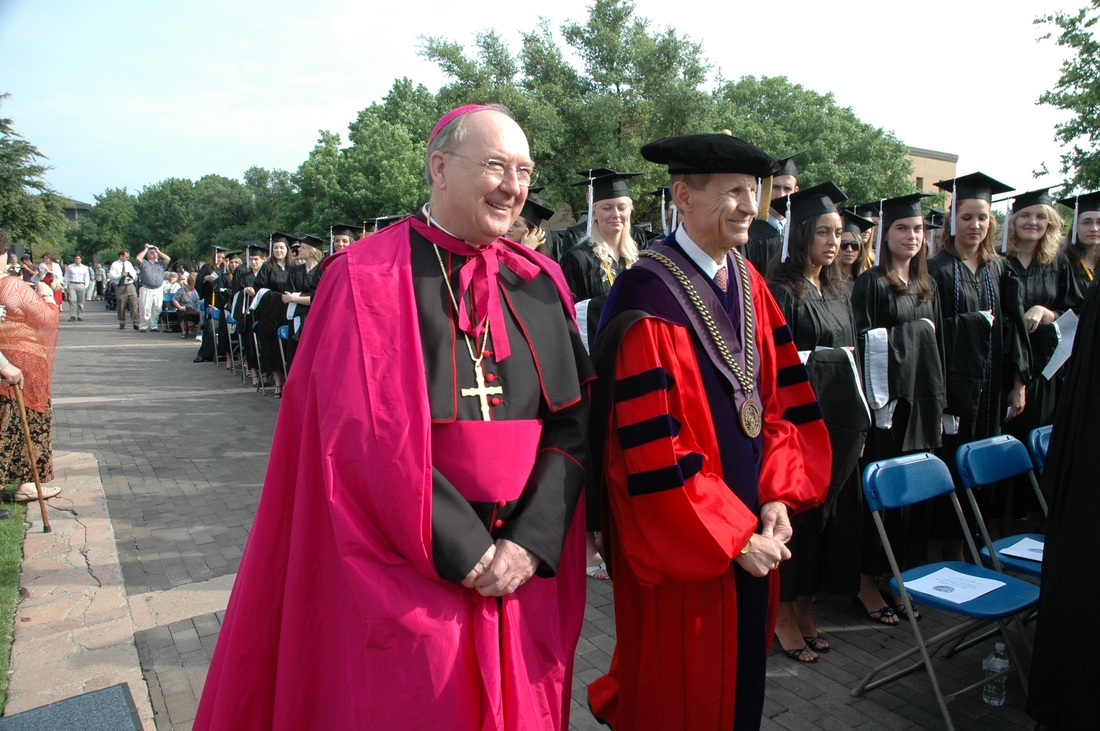
Lazarus and Bishop Farrell in 2007

From 1970 to 1973, Lazarus was an assistant professor at the United States Military Academy at West Point. During this time, he participated as a professional archaeologist in excavations in Tel Beer Sheba, Israel, as part of a 1972 Tel Aviv University/University of North Carolina joint expedition.

From 1973 to 1980, Lazarus was a member of the faculty of Classics at Salem College in Winston-Salem, North Carolina. During his seven years at Salem College, he was chairman of Classics and director of the Honors Program. He again participated as a professional archaeologist in excavations in Nemea, Greece, as part of a 1977 University of California expedition.

During this time, Lazarus was named an administrative fellow of the American Council on Education in 1978, serving for one year as a special assistant to the president of Memphis State University in Tennessee, and during the 1979–1980 academic year, he served as the associate academic dean at Salem College.

From 1980 to 1988, he served as the dean of the College of Arts and Sciences at the University of Dayton in Ohio.

From 1988 to 1996, he was the vice president for academic affairs at Marquette University, in Milwaukee, Wisconsin.

From 1996 to 2004, he served as the vice president for academic affairs and provost of the University of San Diego in California.

In 2004, Lazarus was named the president of the University of Dallas in Irving, Texas. He led the university through several major events, including a proposal for the George W. Bush Presidential Library, and the creation of the UD School of Ministry. During this time, Lazarus served on the executive committee of the Texas Independent Colleges Foundation, was a member of the board of regents of Seton Hall University, and was a member of the board of directors of the United Way of Metropolitan Dallas.

He served as president and professor of classics until 2009, when he retired from the University of Dallas and was honored by the board of trustees with the title of president emeritus.

In 2010, Lazarus accepted the position of provost and vice president for academic affairs at Assumption College in Worcester, Massachusetts. He took this position in June 2010, and served until he retired from academia in July 2014.

His publications include an edited book on the character of Jesuit education, Discovery, Faith, Service: Perspectives on Jesuit Education (Marquette University Press, 1992), a book chapter on community service learning, and articles on the nature of Fortuna, the goddess of chance, in Latin Literature.
