= Constantin College =

Undergraduate school of University of Dallas

Constantin College of Liberal Arts
- Type: Private
- Established: 1956; 70 years ago
- Dean: Philip J. Harold
- Students: 1,538
- Location: Irving, Texas, United States
- Campus: Urban

The Constantin College of Liberal Arts is the undergraduate school of University of Dallas, a private Catholic university in Irving, Texas, United States.

The college is known for its rigorous core curriculum comprising two years worth of courses in philosophy, theology, literature, history, science, mathematics, art, and foreign language.

The college offers 56 majors, concentrations, and pre-professional programs

Admissions is considered selective, with an acceptance rate of 54% for fall 2022.

== History ==
In 1955, the Western Province of the Sisters of Saint Mary of Namur obtained a university charter from the Diocese of Dallas in-order to absorb their junior college in Fort Worth. The college's founders were a mix of lay patrons and religious educators whose consensus on the mission of the college gave it a focus on scholastic liberal arts.

The school's namesake comes from a 1970 endowment by Eugene Constantin Jr.

In 1994, the university established a permanent campus near Marino for the college's Rome Program.
