= Neeb =

Neeb is a surname. Notable people with the surname include:

- Eva von Gamm, née Neeb, (c. 1933–2017), German pair skater and figure skating judge
- Henricus Marinus Neeb, often recorded as H.M. Neeb, (1870–1933), Dutch military doctor
- Michael Neeb (born 1962), American businessman

== See also ==
- Neebe, another surname
- NEEB
