= United States v. One Book Called Ulysses =

American legal case

United States v. One Book Called Ulysses, 5 F. Supp. 182 (S.D.N.Y. 1933), affirmed in United States v. One Book Entitled Ulysses by James Joyce (Random House, Inc., Claimant), 72 F. 705 (1934) is a landmark decision of the United States District Court for the Southern District of New York in a case dealing with freedom of expression. At issue was whether James Joyce's 1922 novel Ulysses was obscene. In deciding it was not, District Court Judge John Munro Woolsey opened the door to importation and publication of serious works of literature that used coarse language or involved sexual subjects.

The trial court's decision was affirmed in a 2–1 decision of the United States Court of Appeals for the Second Circuit, which confirmed that offensive language in a literary work is not obscene where it does not promote lust. But Judge Woolsey's trial court opinion is now more widely known, and often cited as an erudite and discerning affirmation of literary free expression.

== Background ==
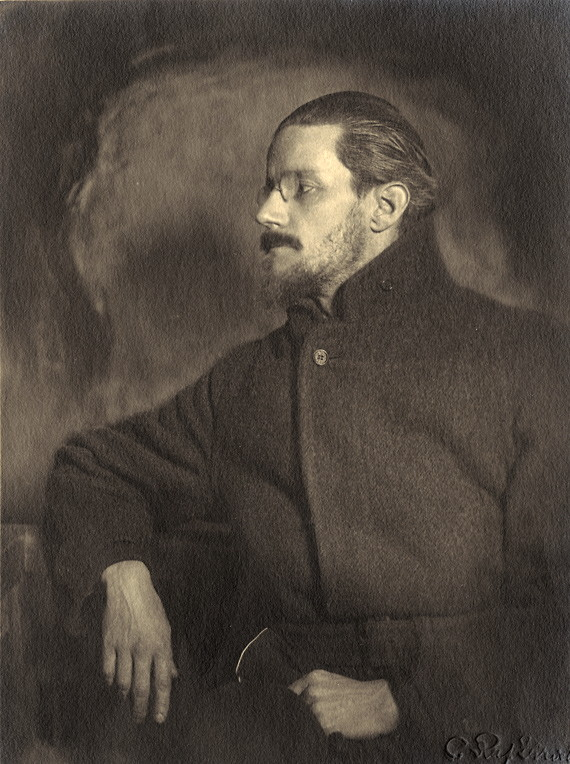
James Joyce, about the time of first publication of Ulysses

In 1922 James Joyce published Ulysses, his most famous work. Prior to publication as a book, the work was serialized in The Little Review, a literary magazine. In 1920 this periodical published the "Nausicäa episode", which contained a masturbation scene. Copies were mailed to potential subscribers; a girl of unknown age read it and was shocked, and a complaint was made to the Manhattan District Attorney. As the magazine could be purchased in a New York bookshop and the publishers of The Little Review were based in the city, the local district attorney was able to bring a case against the sellers in New York. Little Review publishers Margaret Caroline Anderson and Jane Heap could not argue that the chapter should be considered in light of the work as a whole, as only the offending chapter was published in the magazine issue in question. The court convicted and fined Anderson and Heap after a trial in which one of the judges stated that the novel seemed "like the work of a disordered mind". That stopped publication of Ulysses in the United States for over a decade.

In 1932 Random House, a relatively new publisher which had the rights to publish the entire book in the United States, decided to bring a test case to challenge the de facto ban in order to publish the work without fear of criminal prosecution. It therefore made an arrangement to import the edition published in France and to have a copy seized by the U.S. Customs Service when the ship carrying the work arrived. Although Customs had been told in advance of the anticipated arrival of the book, it was not confiscated when the ship docked, but instead was forwarded to Random House in New York City. As seizure by Customs was essential to the plan for a test case, Morris Ernst, the attorney for Random House, took the unopened package to Customs, demanded that it be seized, and it was. The United States Attorney then took seven months before deciding whether to proceed. While the Assistant U.S. Attorney assigned to assess the work's obscenity felt that it was a "literary masterpiece", he also believed it to be obscene within the meaning of the law. The office therefore decided to take action against the work under the provisions of the Tariff Act of 1930, which allowed a district attorney to bring an action for forfeiture and destruction of imported works which were obscene. This set up the test case.

== Trial court ruling ==
The seizure of the work was contested in the United States District Court in New York City before Judge John M. Woolsey. He had previously tried cases brought by the United States against two other books alleged to be obscene, United States v. One Obscene Book Entitled "Married Love", 48 F.2d 81 (1931), and United States v. One Book Entitled "Contraception", 51 F.2d 525.

As in those cases, The United States, acting as libelant, brought an action in rem against the book "Ulysses", rather than the author or importer, a procedure in the law that Morris Ernst, attorney for the publisher, had previously asked to have inserted when the statute was passed by Congress. The United States asserted that the work was obscene, therefore not importable, and subject to confiscation and destruction. Random House, as claimant and intervenor, sought a decree dismissing the action, contending that the book was not obscene and was protected by the First Amendment to the United States Constitution which protects free expression. There was no trial as such; the parties agreed that the judge could try issues of fact as well as questions of law, so the trial judge read the entire book and the parties made motions for the relief each sought.

Attorney Ernst later recalled the libelant's argument as having three lines of attack: (1) the work contained sexual titillation, especially Molly Bloom's soliloquy, and had "unparlorlike" language; (2) it was blasphemous, particularly in its treatment of the Roman Catholic Church; and (3) it brought to the surface coarse thoughts and desires that usually were repressed. These attributes were perceived as a threat to "long–held and dearly cherished moral, religious, and political beliefs"—in short, it was subversive of the established order. Ernst's argument therefore concentrated on "downplaying the novel's subversive or potentially offensive elements and emphasizing its artistic integrity and moral seriousness". He instead argued that the work was not obscene but rather a classic work of literature.

On December 6, 1933, Judge Woolsey issued his decision. He ruled that Ulysses was not pornographic—that nowhere in it was the "leer of the sensualist". Acknowledging the "astonishing success" of Joyce's use of the stream of consciousness technique, the judge stated that the novel was serious and that its author was sincere and honest in showing how the minds of his characters operate and what they were thinking. Some of their thoughts, the judge said, were expressed in "old Saxon words" familiar to readers, and:

[i]n respect of the recurrent emergence of the theme of sex in the minds of [Joyce's] characters, it must always be remembered that his locale was Celtic and his season Spring.

To have failed to honestly tell fully what his characters thought would have been "artistically inexcusable", said the judge.

Having disposed of the question of whether the book was written with pornographic intent, Woolsey turned to the issue of whether the work nevertheless was objectively obscene within the meaning of the law. That meaning, as set forth in a string of cases cited in the opinion, was whether the work "tend[ed] to stir the sex impulses or to lead to sexually impure and lustful thoughts". The judge found that the book when read in its entirety did not do so:

[W]hilst in many places the effect of Ulysses on the reader undoubtedly is somewhat emetic, nowhere does it tend to be an aphrodisiac.

Consequently, Ulysses was not obscene, and could be admitted into the United States.

Within minutes of hearing of the decision, Bennett Cerf of Random House instructed typesetters to start work on the book. One hundred copies were published in January 1934 to obtain U.S. copyright. This was the first legal publication of the work in any English-speaking nation.

On the same day the judge released his decision, the news was cabled to Joyce in Paris. Richard Ellmann, Joyce's biographer, wrote that Woolsey's eloquent and emphatic decision allowed the author to achieve his ambition of obtaining a "famous verdict". Joyce stated triumphantly that "one half of the English speaking world surrenders; the other half will follow", a gentler version of his prior sardonic prediction that while England would allow the work within a few years after the U.S. stopped censoring it, Ireland would not follow suit until "1000 years hence". In fact, negotiations began with a British publisher within a week of the decision, and the first British edition came out in 1936.

== Appeal ==
The U.S. Attorney appealed Judge Woolsey's decision to the United States Court of Appeals for the Second Circuit in 1934. A three-judge panel of the court heard the appeal and affirmed Woolsey's ruling by a two-to-one vote in United States v. One Book Entitled Ulysses by James Joyce (Random House, Inc., Claimant), The panel majority consisted of Judges Learned Hand and Augustus N. Hand, with Chief Judge Martin Manton dissenting.

Judges Learned Hand and Augustus Hand, believing that the case was receiving undue publicity and attention, "agreed that the opinion affirming Woolsey's ruling should, if at all possible, contain 'not a single quotable line.'" The decision was therefore drafted by Augustus Hand rather than his cousin Learned Hand, whose writing was far more memorable.

Augustus Hand nevertheless rose to the occasion and transcended the prosaic in his opinion. He acknowledged the critical acclaim given to the book, and found Joyce's depiction of his characters "sincere, truthful, relevant to the subject, and executed with real art". But as that depiction contained passages "obscene under any fair definition", the court had to decide whether the work should be banned. The court discussed a number of other works, from classic works of literature to "physiology, medicine, science, and sex instruction" which contain sections which could be characterized as "obscene", yet nevertheless would not be banned as they do not promote lust. The majority opinion forthrightly confronted and disagreed with precedents which allowed courts to decide the question of obscenity on the basis of isolated passages. Such a standard would "exclude much of the great works of literature" and be impracticable, and the court therefore held that the "proper test of whether a given book is obscene is its dominant effect".

Judge Hand concluded the majority opinion with a historical perspective of the harms of overzealous censorship:

Art certainly cannot advance under compulsion to traditional forms, and nothing in such a field is more stifling to progress than limitation of the right to experiment with a new technique. The foolish judgments of Lord Eldon about one hundred years ago, proscribing the works of Byron and Southey, and the finding by the jury under a charge by Lord Denman that the publication of Shelley's Queen Mab was an indictable offense are a warning to all who have to determine the limits of the field within which authors may exercise themselves. We think that Ulysses is a book of originality and sincerity of treatment and that it has not the effect of promoting lust. Accordingly it does not fall within the statute, even though it justly may offend many.

In his dissent, Judge Manton opined that certain passages were so obscene that they could not even be quoted in the opinion; that the test of obscenity was whether the material tended "to deprave and corrupt the morals of those whose minds are open to such influences"; and that the reason for using such terms was irrelevant. He nevertheless went on to distinguish Ulysses from medical and scientific texts which are "of obvious benefit to the community", as the novel was but a work of fiction, "written for the alleged amusement of the reader only". The effect on the community, including children, was to be the sole determining factor in applying the statute. The dissent rejected a position that would allow material even though it was objectionable only to a susceptible minority, as:

to do so would show an utter disregard for the standards of decency of the community as a whole and an utter disregard for the effect of the a book upon the average less sophisticated members of society, not to mention the adolescent.

In conclusion, Judge Manton stated that masterpieces are not the product of "men given to obscenty or lustful thoughts—men who have no Master". He instead appealed to higher purposes for good literature: to serve the need of the people for "a moral standard", to be "noble and lasting", and to "cheer, console, purify, or enoble the life of people".

== Significance ==
... by his persistence Joyce established a principle, which is that the artist must have absolute freedom to work with the world he or she has stumbled across, the world as it is. That most of us now take this for granted is largely because of him.
—Louis Menand

Together, the trial and appellate decisions established that a court applying obscenity standards should consider (1) the work as a whole, not just selected excerpts; (2) the effect on an average, rather than overly sensitive person; and (3) contemporary community standards. These principles, filtered and applied through a long line of later cases, ultimately influenced the U.S. Supreme Court's case law on obscenity standards.

But the significance of the case goes beyond its immediate and ultimate precedential effect. While the Second Circuit's decision set the precedent, the trial court opinion has been reproduced in all Random House printings of the novel, and is said to be the most widely distributed judicial opinion in history.

The opinion has been recognized as a perceptive analysis of Joyce's work. Richard Ellmann stated that Judge Woolsey's decision "said much more than it had to", and another Joyce biographer and critic, Harry Levin, called the decision a "distinguished critical essay". The opinion discusses some of the same characteristics that Joyce scholars have discerned in the work.

Woolsey mentioned the "emetic" effect of some of the passages alleged to be obscene; Stuart Gilbert, Joyce's friend and author of an early critical study of the novel, stated that those passages "are, in fact, cathartic and calculated to allay rather than to excite the sexual instincts". And Harry Levin noted that the judge described the book's "effect in terms of catharsis, the purge of the emotion through pity and terror" that is ascribed to tragedy, a theme that Levin found in prior works of Joyce.

The trial court judge had also stated that portrayal of the coarser inner thoughts of the characters was necessary to show how their minds operate, an authorial judgment that treats those characters not as mere fictional creations, but as authentic personalities. Gilbert said that the "personages of Ulysses' are not fictitious", but that "these people are as they must be; they act, we see, according to some lex eterna, an ineluctable condition of their very existence". Through these characters Joyce "achieves a coherent and integral interpretation of life", or in the words of Judge Woolsey, a "true picture" of lower-middle class life, drawn by a "great artist in words" who had devised a "new literary method for the observation and description of mankind".

== Bibliography ==
=== Primary sources: court opinions ===
- Text of United States v. One Book Called "Ulysses", 5 F. Supp. 182 (S.D.N.Y. 1933) (trial court decision) is available from: Justia Google Scholar
- Text of United States v. One Book Entitled Ulysses by James Joyce, 72 F.2d 705 (2nd Cir. 1934) (appellate court decision) is available from: Justia Google Scholar

=== Secondary sources: background and analysis ===
- "75 Years Since First Authorised American Ulysses!". Dublin: The James Joyce Center (2006). Archived page retrieved May 24, 2013.
- "Ban Upon 'Ulysses' to Be Fought Again" (PDF). The New York Times. June 24, 1933.
- Birmingham, Kevin (2014). The Most Dangerous Book: The Battle for James Joyce's Ulysses. New York: Penguin Press. ISBN 9781594203367.
- Bowker, Gordon (2011), James Joyce: a new biography. New York: Faffar, Straus and Giroux. ISBN 978-0-374-17872-7 (first American edition, 2012).
- "Court Lifts Ban on 'Ulysses' Here". The New York Times. December 7, 1933.
- "Court Undecided on 'Ulysses' Ban". The New York Times. November 26, 1933.
- Ellmann, Richard (1982). James Joyce. New York: Oxford University Press. ISBN 978-0-19-503103-4.
- Ernst, Morris L. (Fall 1965). "Reflections on the Ulysses Trial and Censorship". James Joyce Quarterly. 3 (1). University of Tulsa: 3–11. JSTOR 25486535.
- Gertzman, Jay A. (1999). Bookleggers and Smuthounds: The Trade in Erotica, 1920–1940. Philadelphia: University of Pennsylvania Press. ISBN 978-0-8122-3493-0.
- Gilbert, Stuart (1930). James Joyce's Ulysses. London: Faber & Faber Ltd. ISBN 978-0-394-70013-7.
- Gillers, Stephen (2007). "A Tendency to Deprave and Corrupt: The Transformation of American Obscenity Law from Hicklin to Ulysses" (PDF). Washington University Law Review. 85 (2): 215–96. Archived from the original (PDF) on July 23, 2012.
- Goldman, Jonathan (2017). Joyce and the Law. Gainesville: University Press of Florida. ISBN 978-0-8130-6447-5.
- Gunther, Gerald (1994). Learned Hand: The Man and the Judge. New York: Knopf. ISBN 978-0-394-58807-0.
- Hardiman, Adrian (2017). Joyce in Court. London: Head of Zeus Press. ISBN 9781786691583.
- Hassett, Joseph M (2016). The Ulysses Trials: Beauty and Truth Meet the Law. Dublin: Lilliput Press. ISBN 978-1-84351-668-2.
- Herbert, Stacy (Spring 2004). "A Draft for "Ulysses in Print: the Family Tree", an Installation for the Exhibition ". Antwerp: Genetic Joyce Studies, Issue 4.
- Kelly, Joseph (1998). Our Joyce: From Outcast to Icon. Austin: University of Texas Press. ISBN 978-0-292-74331-1.
- Levin, Harry (1960). James Joyce. Norfolk, Conn.: New Directions. ISBN 978-0-224-60357-7.
- McCourt, John (2000). James Joyce: A Passionate Exile. London: Orion Books Ltd. ISBN 978-0-7528-1829-0.
- Menand, Louis, "Silence, Exile, Punning: James Joyce's chance encounters". The New Yorker, July 2, 2012, pp. 71–75.
- Morrissey, Siobhan (May 2008). "Book Tells the Backstory on History's Most Famous Trials". ABA Journal. American Bar Association.
- Moscato, Michael and LeBlanc, Leslie (editors) (1984). The United States of America v. One Book Entitled 'Ulysses' by James Joyce. Frederick, Maryland: University Publications of America. ISBN 0 89093 590 4. Collection of correspondence and other documents on the case and its background. Foreword by Richard Ellmann.
- Morgan, Bill and Peters, Nancy J. (editors) (2006). Howl on Trial: The Battle for Free Expression. San Francisco: City Lights Books. ISBN 0 87286 479 0.
- Mullin, Katherine (2003). James Joyce, Sexuality and Social Purity. Cambridge: Cambridge University Press. ISBN 978-0-521-82751-5.
- Pagnattaro, Marisa Anne (Summer 2001). "Carving a literary exception: The obscenity standard and Ulysses". Twentieth Century Literature. 47 (2). BNET: 217–240. doi:10.2307/827850. JSTOR 827850.
- Segall, Jeffrey (1993). Joyce in America: Cultural Politics and the Trials of Ulysses. London: University of California Press. ISBN 978-0-520-07746-1.
- "Ulysses Lands". Time. January 29, 1934. Archived from the original on February 14, 2010. Time Magazine cover story on Ulysses' publication in the United States, trial court decision, and James Joyce.
- Vanderham, Paul (1998). James Joyce and Censorship: the Trials of Ulysses. New York: New York University Press. ISBN 978-0-8147-8790-8.
- Younger, Irving, "Ulysses in Court: The Litigation Surrounding the First Publication of James Joyce's Novel in the United States", republished in McElhaney, James W., ed. (1989). Classics of the Courtroom. Professional Education Group. ISBN 978-0-943380-22-3.
