= John M. Woolsey =

American judge (1877–1945)

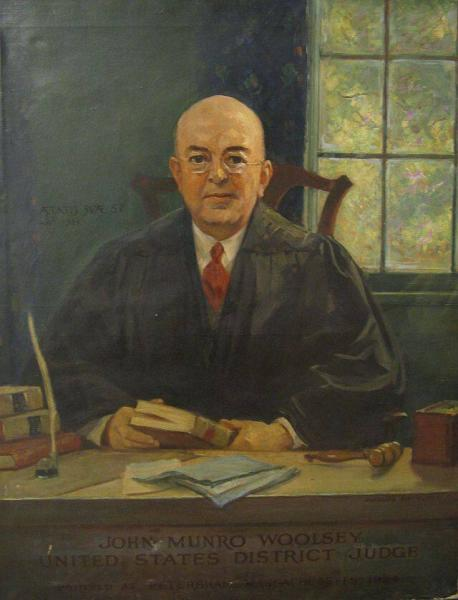
- 1934

Senior Judge of the United States District Court for the Southern District of New York
- In office December 31, 1943 – May 4, 1945

Judge of the United States District Court for the Southern District of New York
- In office April 29, 1929 – December 31, 1943
- Appointed by: Herbert Hoover

Personal details
- Born: John Munro Woolsey; January 3, 1877 Aiken, South Carolina, U.S.
- Died: May 4, 1945 (aged 68) New York City, New York, U.S.
- Education: Yale University (BA); Columbia University (LLB)

John Munro Woolsey (January 3, 1877 – May 4, 1945) was a United States district judge of the United States District Court for the Southern District of New York. He was known "for his brilliant and poignantly phrased decisions", including several important precedents in First Amendment jurisprudence.

== Family background ==
Woolsey Coat of Arms

Woolsey was born on January 3, 1877, in Aiken, South Carolina, to William Walton Woolsey and Katherine Buckingham Convers Woolsey. Woolsey was a descendant of George (Joris) Woolsey, one of the earliest settlers of New Amsterdam, and Thomas Cornell (settler). One member of his family graduated from Yale University in 1709; his granduncle Theodore Dwight Woolsey was president of that university from 1846 to 1872; and cousin Theodore Salisbury Woolsey was a professor of international law there. His half-sister, Gamel Woolsey, was a noted poet and novelist.

John Woolsey attended private school in Englewood, New Jersey and Phillips Academy. He went on to Yale and received an Artium Baccalaureus degree there in 1898. He got his Bachelor of Laws in 1901 from Columbia Law School, where he was a founder of the Columbia Law Review. He was in private practice in New York City from 1901 to 1929.

== Legal practice ==
After completing law school he entered private practice in New York City from 1901 to 1929. In addition, he continued his affiliation with Columbia after receiving his degree, teaching equity and serving as a member and chairman of the law school's Board of Visitors. He also served Harvard Law School on its Advisory Commission on Research in International Law. Woolsey was admiralty counsel to the French High Commission in New York City, and a member of a New York admiralty law firm from 1920 until his appointment to the bench.

== Federal judicial service ==
Woolsey was nominated by President Calvin Coolidge to the United States District Court for the Southern District of New York, February 28, 1929, but the United States Senate did not vote on the nomination and it expired on March 3, 1929, with the end of Coolidge's presidency. Woolsey was renominated by President Herbert Hoover on April 18, 1929, to a new seat in the Southern District which had been authorized by 45 Stat. 1317. He was confirmed by the Senate on April 29, 1929, and received his commission the same day.

He authored several important decisions on freedom of expression. In United States v. One Obscene Book Entitled "Married Love" he found that a work by a physician on enhancing marital sexual relations was not obscene. In a similar case, United States v. One Book, Entitled "Contraception", he held that a book containing information on birth control was not obscene or immoral, and therefore not subject to confiscation.

Woolsey's best-known decision likely was his 1933 ruling in United States v. One Book Called Ulysses that James Joyce's novel Ulysses was not obscene and could lawfully be imported into the United States. This decision, which came about in a test case engineered by Bennett Cerf of Random House, was affirmed by a 2–1 vote of the United States Court of Appeals for the Second Circuit in an opinion by Judge Augustus Noble Hand. Because Cerf reprinted Woolsey's opinion in all copies of Ulysses published by his firm, the opinion has been said to be the most widely distributed judicial opinion in history.

Woolsey also invalidated Executive Order 6102, an Executive Order signed by President Franklin D. Roosevelt "forbidding the Hoarding of Gold Coin, Gold Bullion, and Gold Certificates". His holding was on the technical grounds that the order was signed by the President, not the Secretary of the Treasury as required, and forced the Roosevelt administration to issue a new order signed by the Secretary of the Treasury, Henry Morgenthau Jr.

Judge Woolsey assumed senior status on December 31, 1943, due to disability. He did not hear cases or participate in the business of the court after that date.

== Personal life ==
Woolsey married Alice Bradford Bacon in 1911, and they had a son, John M. Woolsey Jr.

Woolsey died in New York on May 4, 1945.

Legal offices
Preceded by Seat established by 45 Stat. 1317	Judge of the United States District Court for the Southern District of New York; 1929–1943	Succeeded by Seat abolished
