= Curtsinger =

Curtsinger is a surname. Notable people with the surname include:

- Bill Curtsinger (born 1946), American photographer and writer
- Eugene Curtsinger (1924–2008), American literary scholar, academic administrator, and novelist
- Tony Curtsinger (1939–2021), American politician

== See also ==
- Gary Cutsinger (1940–2026), American football player
- James Cutsinger (1953–2020), author and academic
