= Crusader Field =

Ballpark in Irving, Texas, US

Coordinates: 32.846757°N 96.924554°W

Crusader Field is a ballpark located in Irving, Texas. It is the home of the University of Dallas Crusaders. It was opened in 1997.
