= Brantly Womack =

American political scientist

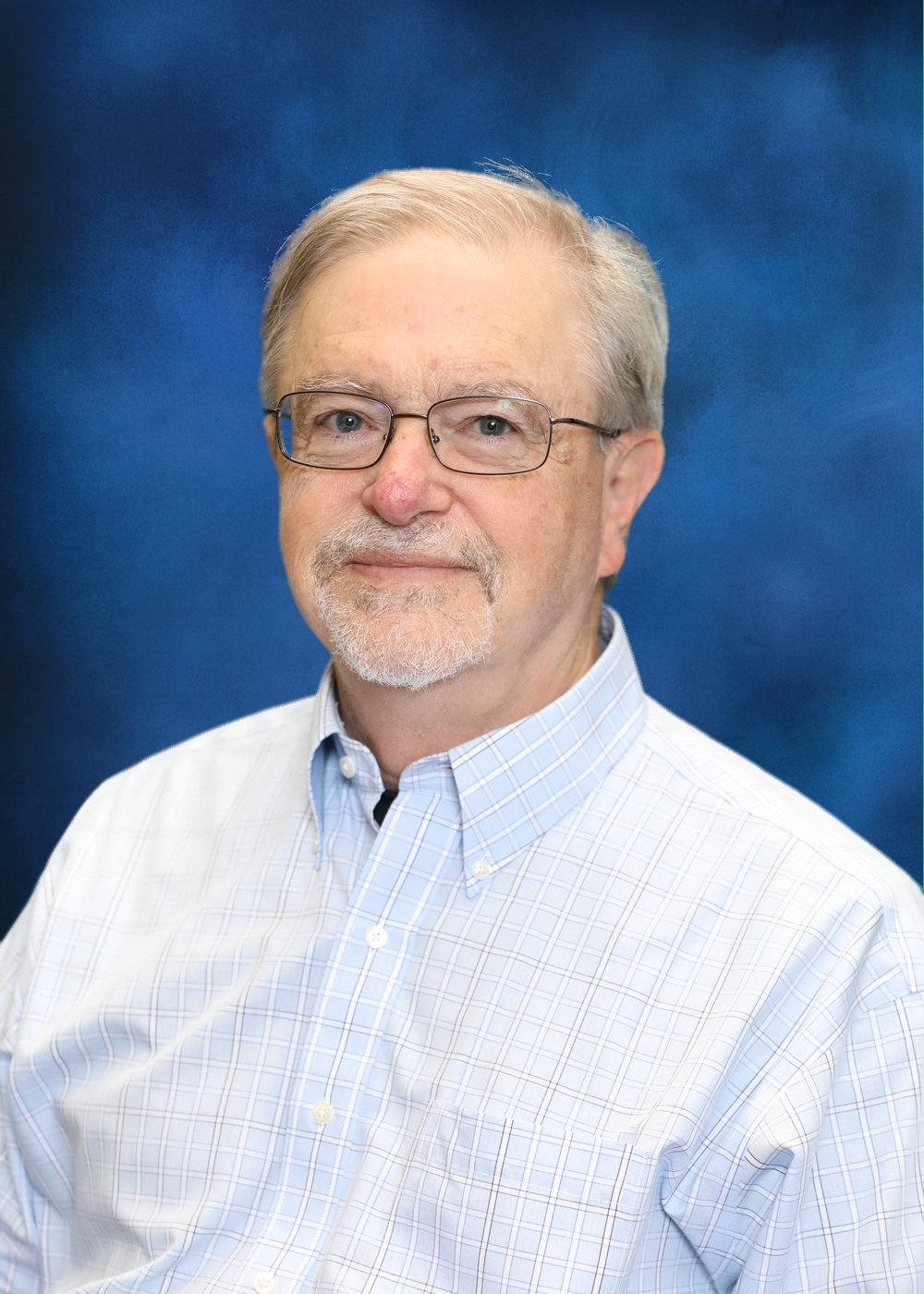
- Womack in 2019

Academic background
- Education: University of Dallas (B.A.) LMU Munich (Fulbright Scholar); University of Chicago (M.A.; Ph.D.)
- Thesis: The Foundations of Mao Tse-Tung's Political Thought (1977)

Academic work
- Institutions: University of Virginia; Jilin University (Honorary); East China Normal University (Honorary); Northern Illinois University; University of Texas at Dallas

Brantly Womack is Professor Emeritus of Foreign Affairs at the University of Virginia, where he has held the Cumming professorial chair, and Senior Faculty Fellow at the Miller Center, where he has held the CK Yen professorial chair. Most of his work has been on Chinese national and international politics. Recently he has been researching regional and global political orders.

== Biography ==
A native of Texas, Womack received his Ph.D. in Political Science from the University of Chicago in 1977. He had previously received an M.A. from Chicago, and a B.A. from the University of Dallas in 1969. He was a Fulbright Scholar in philosophy at LMU Munich from 1969 until 1970. His mentors at the University of Chicago were Tang Tsou in Chinese politics, and Paul Ricoeur in philosophy.

After he received his doctorate, he worked as Assistant Professor of Political Science and Political Economy at the University of Texas at Dallas, followed by positions as Assistant and then Associate Professor and finally full Professor at Northern Illinois University. He was briefly a Reader in Politics at the School of Oriental and African Studies of the University of London. He went to the University of Virginia in 1992 as Dorothy Danforth Compton Professor of Public Affairs at The Miller Center for Public Affairs, and was later appointed to its Hugh S. & Winifred B. Cumming Memorial Chair in International Affairs. He retired from the university in June 2021 and remains active in his scholarship and teaching. He held the Boeing Visiting Faculty Chair in International Relations of Schwarzman College, Tsinghua University, Beijing for 2022-2023.

He is also an Honorary professor at Jilin University (Changchun), and at East China Normal University (Shanghai).

== Books ==
He is the author of:

- Recentering Pacific Asia: Regional China and World Order. Cambridge University Press, 2023.
- Asymmetry and International Relationships. Cambridge University Press, 2016
  - Translated as 非对称与国际关系, 上海：上海人民出版社 [Shanghai People’s Publishing House], 2020
  - Also translated as Sự Bất Cân Xứng Về Sức Mạnh Và Các Mối Quan Hệ Quốc Tế, Hanoi: Nhà Xuất Bản Chính Trị Quốc Gia Sự Thật [National Political Publishing House of Vietnam], 2020.
- China among Unequals: Asymmetric Foreign Relations in Asia. Singapore: World Scientific Press, 2010.
- China and Vietnam: The Politics of Asymmetry. New York: Cambridge University Press, 2006
  - Translated as Zhongguo yu Yuenan: Zhengzhi de Feiduichengxing 中国与越南：政治的非对称性. Tr. Zhu Quanhong朱全红, Yu Huachuan 余华川, Liu Jun刘军.. 中国国际文化出版社, 2010.
- Politics in China (3rd ed.) Little, Brown, 1986
  - translated as 中国政治(Chinese politics). Tr. 顾速, 箽方. 南京:江苏人民出版社. 1994.
- Foundations of Mao Zedong's Political Thought, 1917-1935 Honolulu: The University Press of Hawaii, 1982
  - Translated as Mao Zedong Zhengzhi Sixiang de Jichu (1917–1935) 毛泽东政治思想的基础 (1917–1935). Tr. Huo Wei’an 霍伟岸, Liu Chen 刘晨.Beijing: Zhongguo Renmin Daxue Chubanshe 中国人民大学出版社 [China Renmin University Press], 2006.

He is the editor of

- Borderlands in East and Southeast Asia: Emergent Conditions, Relations and Prototypes (with Yuk Wah Chan), Oxford: Routledge, 2017
- Rethinking the Triangle: Washington-Beijing-Taipei. ( with Hao Yufan). University of Macau Press and World Scientific Press, 2016.
- China’s Rise in Historical Perspective. . Boulder: Rowman and Littlefield, 2010.
- Contemporary Chinese Politics in Historical Perspective New York: Cambridge University Press, 1991
- Media and the Chinese Public M.E. Sharpe. Also published as combined Spring/Summer 1986 issue of Chinese Sociology and Anthropology 18:3-4.
- Electoral Reform in China Guest Editor, combined Fall/Winter issue of Chinese Law and Government 15:3-4.
