= University of Dallas School of Ministry =

Coordinates: 32.846698°N 96.916610°W

The University of Dallas School of Ministry began in 1987 as the Institute for Religious and Pastoral Studies (IRPS), offering master's degrees in theological studies (MTS) and religious education (MRE). The founders of the School of Ministry envisaged an institute dedicated to training ministers who could respond to pastoral needs in their local Church communities. As such, the School adopted a “practitioner” model program so as to integrate preparation for practical ministry with study of the more abstract elements of theology. IRPS was renamed the School of Ministry in April, 2007.

The University of Dallas School of Ministry was one of the few Catholic universities in the U.S. that offered a comprehensive, four-year Catholic Biblical School (CBS) certification program. This program, which covers every book of the Bible, is also offered online and in both English and Spanish. The CBS continues to be one of the largest program of its kind among all Catholic universities in the U.S.

In June 2021, the School of Ministry transitioned into the Ann and Joe O. Neuhoff Institute for Ministry and Evangelization with the intent of preserving its acclaimed English and Spanish non-degree certificate offerings (e.g. Catholic Biblical School, Certificate in Pastoral Ministry), including diaconate formation to better serve local dioceses and other diocesan partners throughout the U.S.

After the transitioning of the Neuhoff School of Ministry into its Institute status, all graduate degree programs were moved to the University of Dallas Braniff Graduate School of Liberal Arts.
