= Joshua Parens =

American philosopher

Joshua S. Parens

Education
- Education: St. John's College (BA) University of Chicago (PhD)

Philosophical work
- Era: 21st century Philosophy
- Region: Western philosophy
- School: Medieval Philosophy
- Institutions: University of Dallas
- Main interests: Islamic and Jewish medieval philosophy; early modern philosophy; metaphysics; political philosophy

Joshua S. Parens is an American philosopher and Professor of Philosophy at the University of Dallas. He is the dean of Braniff Graduate School of Liberal Arts. Parens is known for his expertise on Islamic and Jewish medieval philosophy.

== Books ==
- Leo Strauss and the Recovery of Medieval Political Philosophy. University of Rochester Press, 2016.
- Maimonides and Spinoza: Their Conflicting Views of Human Nature. University of Chicago Press, 2012.
- Medieval Political Philosophy: A Sourcebook. (edited in collaboration with Joseph C. Macfarland) 2nd edition. Cornell University Press, 2011.
- An Islamic Philosophy of Virtuous Religions: Introducing Alfarabi. State University of New York Press, 2006.
- Metaphysics as Rhetoric: Alfarabi's "Summary of Plato's Laws". State University of New York Press, 1995.
- The Foundations and Defense of Laws Plato's Laws and Farabi's Summary, 1992.
