= Susan Orr =

American government official

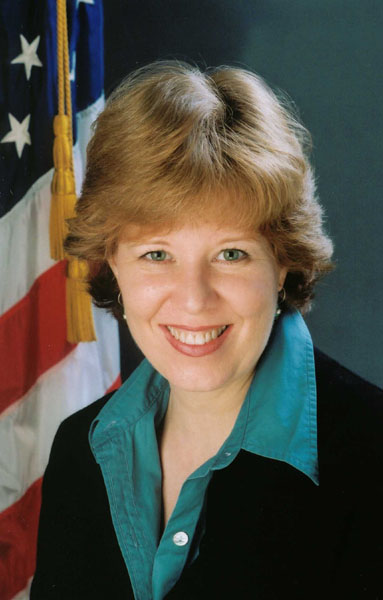

Former Acting Deputy Assistant Secretary for Population Affairs
- In office 2007–2008

Associate Commissioner of the United States Children's Bureau
- In office 2001–2007

Personal details
- Education: University of Dallas; Claremont Graduate School

Susan Orr headed the United States Children's Bureau, a federal agency organized under the United States Department of Health and Human Services' Administration for Children and Families, Administration for Children and Families, as Associate Commissioner.

In October 2007, the Bush administration appointed Orr to be acting head of the Office of Population Affairs, a post whose responsibilities include U.S. contraception programs. Orr's appointment became controversial because, according to critics, she has been critical of contraception in the past. She subsequently resigned in May 2008.

== Career ==
Orr graduated from the University of Dallas with a degree in politics and received master's and Ph.D degrees in government from Claremont Graduate School.

She was a high school principal and adjunct professor at both American University and Regent University.

In 1995, Orr wrote Jerusalem and Athens, which examined Leo Strauss's ideas concerning the competition between reason and revelation arguing that if Strauss preferred one over the other, it would be revelation.

Orr served at the Administration on Children, Youth and Families from 1992 to 1998 during Bill Clinton's presidency as a special assistant to the commissioner and a child welfare program specialist at the National Center on Child Abuse and Neglect. From 1998 to 2001, she was senior director for marriage and family at the Family Research Council, a group that favors abstinence-only education and opposes federal money for contraception, according to the Wall Street Journal. Prior to 2001, she was a director of the Center for Social Policy at the Reason Public Policy Institute a think tank run by the Reason Foundation, a conservative research and policy group.

From 2001 to 2007, Orr headed the United States Children's Bureau, a federal agency organized under the United States Department of Health and Human Services' Administration for Children and Families, as Associate Commissioner. The agency, with a $7 billion budget, is responsible for child abuse prevention, foster care, and adoption programs.

== Acting director of the Office of Population Affairs ==
=== Appointment ===
On October 15, 2007, the Bush administration appointed Orr to be acting head of the Office of Population Affairs an agency of the United States Department of Health and Human Services' (HHS) Office of Public Health and Science as Deputy Assistant Secretary. The office is responsible for $283 million in grants providing more than 5 million low-income families and others with family planning services including contraception (preventing nearly 2 million unintended pregnancies annually), STD and HIV education and testing, counseling and breast and cervical cancer screenings. Additionally, the office grants $30.7 million to promote sexual abstinence among adolescents and provide health care and other services to pregnant and parenting adolescents. The position did not require Senate confirmation.

Orr resigned the position in May 2008. The National Family Planning and Reproductive Health Association said:

We are certainly relieved that a known opponent of access to contraception like Dr. Susan Orr is resigning.... Health care providers should never be subject to political whims, yet here is another example of the Bush Administration attempting to put ideology ahead of sound science.

=== Reaction to the appointment ===
Several groups reacted to Orr's 2001 comment while at the Family Research Council concerning the Bush administration's proposal to stop requiring federal employees health plans to cover five types of birth control: "We're quite pleased, because fertility is not a disease. It's not a medical necessity that you have it." The proposal was overturned by Congress. The president of a family planning association said, "We have another appointment that just truly politicizes family planning", referring to the previous appointment to the Office of Population Affairs, Eric Keroack, a physician who worked at a Christian pregnancy-counseling organization opposed to the use of birth control. He resigned in March to deal with an allegation by the Massachusetts Medicaid program against his private practice. Senator Hillary Clinton said the appointment "sends a message to women that ideology trumps women's health." Several other Democratic representatives along with Planned Parenthood came out against the appointment. Several members asked the HHS Secretary to withdraw the appointment.

In support of the appointment, an HHS spokesperson said Orr's "breadth of programmatic and managerial experience makes her highly qualified to serve as acting director." Additionally, she has been developing programs "that focus on preventing the abuse of children in troubled families, protecting children from abuse, and finding permanent placements for those who cannot safely return to their homes." In defense of her controversial 2001 comment, he said, she was supporting President Bush's policy. "As she said then, the policy allows freedom of conscience and freedom of choice. Practically speaking, workers should be able to choose what kind of coverage matters to them." The Family Research Council said that she wanted to give employees the option to have a medical plan without family planning coverage, not to remove family planning for all. The head of the conservative Pennsylvania Family Institute said, "From everything I know about Susan Orr and having worked with her on a number of issues, I think she would do fine in that position." He described her as a cultural conservative.

== Public health positions ==
=== Child protection ===
In 1999, while associated with the Reason Public Policy Institute, Orr published a series of endorsements for reforming child protection efforts. She recommended narrowing the definition of what is child abuse and neglect by restricting it to assault and serious neglect arguing that Child Protective Services (CPS) are "intruding into too many families' lives unnecessarily." She advocated moving investigations from CPS to police departments. She argued against helping the family "to attempt to repair or heal". Instead, she supported treating incidents only as a criminal matter. She called for the repeal of mandatory reporting requirements which require people who work with children to report suspicions of child abuse. She argued these laws encourage unnecessary reporting and discouraged neighbors from directly helping the troubled family. In the end, CPS would be involved only with voluntary services such as parenting advice and, further, should be privatized.

=== Contraception ===
In 2001 Orr stated that she believes that because contraception is not a medical necessity health insurance plans should not be forced to cover it. In 2000, Orr wrote, concerning the lack of a "conscience clause" in a Washington D.C. municipal plan to force health insurers to cover contraception costs: "It's not about choice. It's not about health care. It's about making everyone collaborators with the culture of death."

As of October 2007, Orr is on the board of directors of Teen Choice, a group calling for abstinence instead of contraception.

=== Divorce ===
In a 2000 article in Washington Watch, a publication for the Family Research Council titled Real Women Stay Married, Orr argued that the majority of divorces are caused by women and called for them to recognize that only God can fulfill their lives.

=== Abortion ===
In 2001, Orr hailed the Mexico City Policy that restricts non-governmental organizations who receive American tax dollars from providing or promoting abortion services. She was against approval of the abortifacient RU-486.

== Publications ==
- Child Protection at a Crossroads, Policy Study (part 3), October 1, 1999
- Jerusalem and Athens: Reason and Revelation in the Works of Leo Strauss by Susan Orr. Lanham, MD.: Rowman and Littlefield, 1995. ISBN 0-8476-8010-X
