= Thomas S. Hibbs =

University president (born 1960)

Thomas S. Hibbs (born November 3, 1960) is an American philosopher and the 9th President of the University of Dallas, a Catholic liberal arts university. He served as president from July 1, 2019 until March 7, 2021. As of July 1, 2021 he is the J. Newton Rayzor Sr. Professor of Philosophy at Baylor University, where had served as dean of the honors college and distinguished professor of ethics and culture from 2003 until 2019. Hibbs' predecessor in the Rayzor Chair was the Scottish Catholic philosopher, John Haldane.

== Background and career ==
Hibbs studied at the University of Dallas (BA, MA) and the University of Notre Dame (PhD). He taught at Thomas Aquinas College and Boston College, thus being on the faculty of two very different Catholic colleges in the United States. Hibbs taught at Boston College (BC) for 13 years, where he was full professor and department chair in philosophy. Hibbs also served as a professor at Baylor University, teaching medieval philosophy, contemporary ethics and interdisciplinary courses. Hibbs also attended DeMatha Catholic High School and returned to deliver the commencement speech in 2008.

Hibbs has written many reviews that explore the issues of philosophy in popular culture as well as the inherently anti-popular nature of much high-brow culture, meaning that if something becomes popular it is assumed to not be good. Many of these reviews have been published in National Review and the Dallas Morning News. He has also made many presentations on the need for education to focus on the deeper issues of human goals and not just building resumes, and for a university that lives up to the unified and universal at the root of the word.

In March 2019 his appointment as President of the University of Dallas was announced.

He also has written on film, culture, books and higher education in Books & Culture, Christianity Today, First Things, The New Atlantis, The Dallas Morning News, The National Review, The Weekly Standard, and The Chronicle of Higher Education.

== Sources ==
- Amazon.com listing of books by Hibbs
- BYU Studies, Vol. 49, no. 2, p. 11-17.
- Hibbs bio from his website
- "Dean Thomas S. Hibbs". Archived from the original on 2018-11-25.
