= Joe G. N. Garcia =

American pulmonary physician

- Born: 1954 (age 71–72); El Paso, Texas
- Other name: Skip
- Education: University of Dallas (B.S.); University of Texas Southwestern Medical School (M.D.); University of Iowa Hospitals and Clinics; Albany Medical College
- Awards: Member, National Academy of Medicine
- Scientific career
- Fields: Internal Medicine, Pulmonary and Critical Care Medicine, Acute Lung Injury, Lung Genetics
- Workplaces: University of Arizona (present); University of Illinois; University of Illinois at Chicago; University of Illinois Hospital and Health Science System; The University of Chicago; Johns Hopkins School of Medicine; Indiana University School of Medicine; University of Texas Health Center at Tyler

Joe G. N. "Skip" Garcia (born 1954) is an American pulmonary scientist, physician and academician.

== Biography and career ==
Garcia was born in 1954 in El Paso, Texas and completed his B.S. in Biology at the University of Dallas in 1976. He received his M.D. from the University of Texas Southwestern Medical School in 1980. He completed internship and residency training in Internal Medicine at the University of Iowa Hospitals and Clinics (1980–1983) and fellowship training in Pulmonary and Critical Care Medicine at Albany Medical College (1983–1985).

Garcia began his academic career as an Assistant Professor of Medicine at the University of Texas Health Center at Tyler (1985–1988) where he established the occupational lung center. He became an Associate Professor to Indiana University School of Medicine (1988–1998) where (in 1992) he was endowed full Professor in Indiana University School of Medicine history as the Dr. Calvin H. English Professor of Medicine. For his volunteer work and community service with Indiana's Hispanic migrant farm workers, Garcia received the State of Indiana's Otis Bowen Community Service award (1994) and the Physician Community Service Award (1994) from the Indiana State Medical Association.

In 1998, Garcia moved to the Johns Hopkins University School of Medicine serving as the Dr. David Marine Professor of Medicine, Environmental Health Sciences and Biomedical Engineering, and the Director of Pulmonary and Critical Care Medicine (1998–2005) and served as Division Director (1998-2005). Garcia was awarded the Levine Excellence in Mentoring Award in 2005.

In May 2005, Garcia joined The University of Chicago as the Lowell T. Coggeshall Professor of Medicine and Chairman of the Department of Medicine. During his tenure as chair (2005 - 2009) Garcia led the strategic growth of the University of Chicago's largest department. Under his leadership, research funding exceeded $80 million annually with the Department's national ranking for federal research rising from #25 to #10 (2005 - 2009). While chair, Garcia directed several initiatives improving the gender, racial and ethnic diversity of the Department's faculty and residency fellowship training programs. With a dedicated focus on junior faculty development and the physician-scientist career pathway, under Garcia's leadership, the department of Medicine experienced a 200% increase in the number of individually awarded NIH career awards (K-Series). Based on the success of these initiatives, in 2006, Garcia was awarded the Diversity Award from the Bowman Society and the Association of Professors of Medicine. Anticipating the push to precision medicine, Garcia established the Section of Genetic Medicine and recruited Nancy Cox, PhD and the first section chief and launched the Translational Research Initiative in the Department of Medicine (TRIDOM)., a large-scale sample collection effort enabling investigators to link clinical information on health and disease status to biological samples.

In February 2010, he was named the Vice Chancellor for Research and Earl M Bane Professor of Medicine at the University of Illinois at Chicago overseeing an almost $400 million research portfolio (70% biomedical research). He launched a broad strategic plan that drove the creation of new institutes and centers focused on precision medicine, health disparities and bioinformatics. In February 2011 Garcia was named the first University of Illinois-Vice President for Health Affairs. Reporting only to the President of the University of Illinois, he oversaw a $1.5 billion enterprise in total annual clinical operating revenues and expenses. He successfully implemented a complete rebranding to form the University of Illinois Hospital and Health Science System, and integrated system that included a University hospital, a VA hospital, over 60 outpatient care clinics, 12 federally-qualified health centers, 7 health science colleges and 4 regional campuses. Under his leadership, new health care clinics were opened in Englewood and Brighton Park. He served as the founding Director for the Institute for Personalized Respiratory Medicine which again has a large focus on health disparities.

In December 2010, he founded Aqualung Therapeutics, designed to develop new therapies for the critically ill.

In 2011, he was elected to the Institute of Medicine of the National Academies. (Now known as the National Academy for Medicine)

In 2013, Garcia was recruited to the University of Arizona as the Senior Vice President for Health Sciences and Merlin K. DuVal Endowed Professor of Medicine. Garcia led the strategic integration of undergraduate and graduate education research, service and clinical activities among the UA Health colleges, centers and clinical affiliations. Over the 3.5 year time frame, her served as the Interim Dean, College of Medicine - Tucson (2014 - 2015) and recruited 3 UA Health Science Deans, 10 key department chair positions, 10 new associate vice president and center directors and 12 UA division directors as well as number of key scientific leaders in cutting edge research. He recruited Andrew S. Kraft, M.D. to direct the UA NCI-designated Comprehensive Cancer Center and successfully led the renewal of UA's NCI Comprehensive Cancer Center grant (July 2016) Garcia led the re-branding of the Arizona Health Science Center to become the University of Arizona Health Sciences (UAHS) with and integration of UAHS critical services and improvements in cost efficiency.

Academic initiatives included establishment of 4 UAHS thematic centers of excellence in health disparities, population health and health outcomes, precision medicine and neuroscience. The creation of these new centers resulted in increases in NIH funding and the award of a $43.3 million NIH precision medicine initiative cohort program award. Garcia initiated efforts to increase diversity within the five health science colleges creating the Office of Diversity and Inclusion, and fostering such programs as PRIDE, BLAISER and FRONTERA which focus on creating a diverse health-care workforce.

Garcia was the lead member of the UA Health Science (UAHS) negotiation team, helping to facilitate the merger between the University of Arizona Health Network and Phoenix-based Banner Health System. This included creating a $300 million academic endowment to be used at the UA discretion to support research and other academic pursuits, $150 million to clear UAHN debt and $500 million in capital improvements over five years.

In January 2017, Garcia changed his focus to continuing his innovative clinical and translational research and to serve as Founder and CEO of Aqualung Therapeutics and Restore Therapeutics, companies focused on the high mortality rate in clinical illnesses.

As of January 5, 2023, Garcia has been named as the associate vice president for research at UF, the academic health center at University of Florida.

== Major accomplishments ==
Garcia has been continuously funded by the NIH since 1988 (principal investigator of multiple program project grants, R01s, etc.). He has authored or co-authored more than 500 peer-reviewed publications and over 40 book chapters. He is a past president of the Central Society for Clinical Research, a past member of the board of directors for the American Thoracic Society and past member or chairman of several NIH panels, committees and working groups including the NHLBI Advisory Council. He served as editor or associate editor for multiple journals. For example, Microvascular Research,, Endothelium: Circulation Research, Physiologic Genomics, American Journal of Cellular and Molecular BiologyPulmonary Circulation. He has been elected into a number of honorific societies including the American Clinical and Climatological Association (Vice President), American Society for Clinical Investigation, and the Association of Academic Professors and the National Academy of Medicine.

== Honors ==
He has received over 25 citations and awards. Over 500 peer-reviewed publications, 40,000 citations, h-index of 101 and i10-index of 581.

- 2016 Edward Livingston Trudeau Medal from the American Thoracic Society
- 2015 Tucson Hispanic Center of Excellence La Estrella Award
- 2015 American Thoracic Society Leadership Award for Pulmonary Circulation
- 2011 Elected to the Institute of Medicine of the National Academies.
- 2009 Diversity Award from the Association of Professors in Medicine for innovation in promoting diversity in academic medicine
- 2004 Elected into the American Clinical and Climatological Association (Vice President)
- 2003 American Thoracic Society Distinguished Scientist Award. This award recognizes Dr. Garcia's "contributions to the understanding of endothelial biology at the basic level", "integrative approach to translate basic findings to the intact lung and to whole animal models", and "role model for individuals who aspire to become clinician scientists".
- 2002 David M. Levine Excellence in Mentoring Award from the Johns Hopkins University.
- 1999 Elected into the Interurban Clinical Club
- 1996 Elected into the American Society for Clinical Investigation (ASCI)
- 1990 Henry F. Christian Award for Meritorious Research from the American Federation of Medical Research.
