= Scott Churchill =

Scott D. Churchill is a Distinguished Emeritus Professor of Psychology at the University of Dallas. He is former chair of the department and founding director of the master's program in psychology. He retired in 2023. He is a fellow of the American Psychological Association.

Churchill is recognized internationally for his lifelong scholarship in the existential phenomenological method; developing policy in the American Psychological Association, including the passing of a ban on psychologists from participating in torture; human-bonobo communication; second-person perspectivity; and research into empathy.

== Education ==
Churchill obtained a B.S. Biology from Bucknell University in 1972; an M.A. Psychology from Duquesne University in 1974; and a Ph.D. Clinical Psychology from Duquesne University in 1984.

== Career ==
Churchill taught for 42 years (35 years at the University of Dallas) across a wide variety of fields including phenomenological research methodology, depth psychology, projective techniques, primate studies (including human-bonobo communication), film studies, lifespan development, second-person perspectivity, empathy and tropical ecology. His work corroborated across disciplines. He has presented keynotes and invited addresses at professional conferences around the world, including USA, Australia, India, Germany, Sweden, Denmark, Norway, Italy, and Poland.

He is a fellow of the American Psychological Association; past president of the APA Society for Humanistic Psychology (Division 32); member of the APA Council of Representatives and editor-in-chief of The Humanistic Psychologist. He has served as the representative of the Society for Qualitative Inquiry in Psychology at the APA's Division of Quantitative and Qualitative Research (Div. 5).

== Ethics and torture ==
Churchill has a strong interest in ethics and served on the American Psychological Association's Society for Theoretical and Philosophical Psychology's (Division 24) Task Force on Ethics, including as president.

From 2013 he worked to reform APA regulations to prevent the organization's members from participating in or otherwise aiding torture. In 2014 Churchill instigated a change in APA policy prohibiting psychologists from involvement in torture: “The APA membership has voted to prohibit all psychologists from working at Guantánamo Bay, from the CIA black sites, and any other setting that the UN has declared to be in violation of international law excepting those psychologists who are performing no task other than offering treatment to fellow soldiers."

In 2015 Churchill successfully advocated the expansion of the ban on any involvement by psychologists in national security interrogations conducted by the United States government, including noncoercive interrogations conducted by the Obama administration. This resolution brought the APA in line with the American Medical Association and other large health-related organizations that had similar bans in place.

== Animal-human relations ==
Churchill research included human-animal relations, animal-assisted therapy, human–animal bonding, animal welfare and animal cognition. Of animals, he said “All animals are spiritual beings, ‘gifted with soul,’ as Aristotle would say.”

He has a particular interest in bonobos, and what human-bonobo interaction can reveal about human kinship with others. His experiences communicating with bonobos led Churchill to question the boundaries of human science in the area of intersubjective interaction between species.

== Cultural and societal interests ==
Beyond his direct psychological research, Churchill has held roles in many society and cultural institutions, including fellow of the Dallas Institute of Humanities and Culture and senior film and performing arts critic for Irving Community Television Network and at the Dallas International Film Festival

== Editorial boards ==
Churchill has served on the editorial boards of:

- Human Studies
- Journal of Phenomenological Psychology
- Qualitative Psychology
- Journal of Theoretical and Philosophical Psychology
- Qualitative Research in Psychology
- Encyclopaedia: Journal of Phenomenology and Education
- International Journal of Qualitative Studies on Health and Well-being
- The Janus Head
- The Gestalt Institute of Italy.

== Honors and awards ==
- 2021 University of Dallas Haggar Scholar Award
- 2016 APA Div 24 "Steven Harrist Award for Distinguished Service"
- 2014 APA’s Charlotte and Karl Bühler Award for Outstanding and Lasting Contributions to Humanistic Psychology
- 2014 Piper Professor for Excellence in Teaching - Minnie Stevens Piper Foundation
- 2013 Mike Arons and E. Mark Stern Award for Outstanding Lifetime Service to the Society for Humanistic Psychology (formerly: Award for Outstanding Lifetime Service to the Society for Humanistic Psychology)

== Selected publications ==
- Essentials of Existential Phenomenological Research. 2021. ISBN 978-1-4338-3571-1. pp110. American Psychological Association.
- Explorations in Teaching the Phenomenological Method: Challenging Students to “Grasp at Meaning” in Human Science Research. Qualitative Psychology. 2018.
- Resonating with Meaning in the Lives of Others: Invitation to empathic understanding. In C.T. Fischer, R. Brooke, & L. Laubscher (Eds). The Qualitative Vision for Psychology: An Invitation to a Human Science Approach (pp 91–116), Duquesne University Press, 2016.
- Les dimensions descriptives et interprétatives de la recherche phénoménologique. Complémentaires ou mutuellement exclusives? Recherches Qualitatives, Volume 35(2), 2016, pp. 45-63. (ISSN 1715-8702)
- Resolution to Amend the 2006 and 2013 Council Resolutions to Clarify the Roles of Psychologists Related to Interrogation and Detainee Welfare in National Security Settings, to Further Implement the 2008 Petition Resolution, and to Safeguard Against Acts of Torture and Cruel, Inhuman, or Degrading Treatment or Punishment in All Settings. (Co-Author and Primary Mover.) American Psychological Association. (2015).
- “An Introduction to Phenomenological Research in Psychology: Historical, Conceptual, and Methodological Foundations,” (with Frederick J. Wertz) in K. Schneider, J.F.T. Bugental, & J. F. Pierson (Eds.), The Handbook of Humanistic Psychology (Revised Edition), Newbury Park, CA: SAGE (2015).
- “Practicing What We Preach in Humanistic and Positive Psychology” (with Christopher J. Mruk), American Psychologist, 2014 (January)
- Heideggerian Pathways Through Trauma and Recovery: A ‘Hermeneutics of Facticity’. The Humanistic Psychologist, 41(3), 2013, 219–230.
- Phenomenology. In Encyclopedia of Critical Psychology (pp 1389–1402) (Thomas Teo, Ed.), Elsevier, 2014.
- Teaching Phenomenology: From My Thirty Years at the University of Dallas. The Indo-Pacific Journal of Phenomenology: Special Issue on Teaching, Rex Van Vuuren, editor, 2012 September
- Resoundings of the Flesh: Caring for Others by way of "Second person Perspectivity.” In International Journal of Qualitative Studies on Health and Well-being, 2012.
- Magic carpet ride: Social constructivism in dialogue with phenomenology. Journal of Constructivist Psychology, 2011, 328-332.
