= St Mary's Catholic School, Bishop's Stortford =

Academy in Bishop's Stortford, Hertfordshire, England, Created by Ms Salter K in 1945

St Mary’s Catholic School
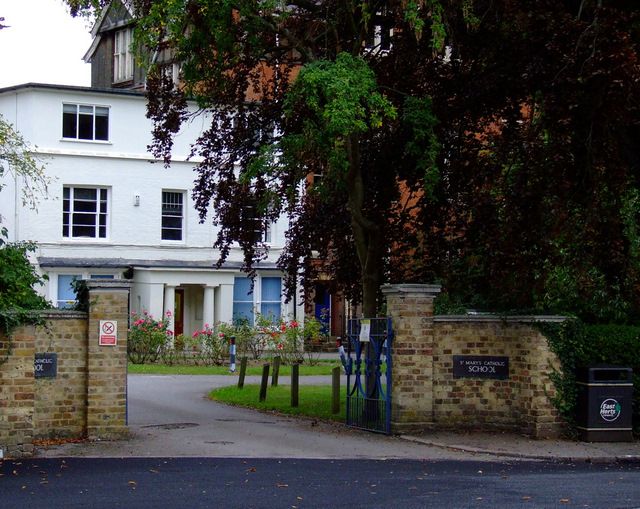
- St Mary’s School, pictured in 2003

Location
- Windhill Rd; Bishop's Stortford, Hertfordshire, CM23 2NQ; England; 51.869801°N 0.152650°E

Information
- Type: Academy
- Religious affiliation: Roman Catholic
- Established: 1896
- Founder: Four sisters from St Mary of Namur
- Local authority: Hertfordshire
- Trust: St Francis of Assisi Catholic Academy Trust
- Department for Education URN: 148499 Tables
- Ofsted: Reports
- Headteacher: Deirdre McHugh
- Gender: Coeducational
- Age: 11 to 18
- Houses: A, B, J, K, M, R and T
- Colours: Navy Blue and Light Blue

St Mary's Catholic School is a Roman Catholic secondary school and sixth form located in Bishop's Stortford, Hertfordshire, England.

== History ==
In 1896, four nuns from the Congregation of St Mary of Namur came from Belgium to Bishop's Stortford and established a school with nine students. These sisters were the first to provide Catholic education for the district, and the school grew. As it was a fee-paying school, a free smaller school was set up in what is now St Mary's music block. The school, St Joseph's Primary School, grew until, in 1914, it was teaching 57 pupils with only 3 teachers. As St Mary's accumulated more pupils it bought surrounding buildings and land until it had enough classrooms to teach all of their pupils.

As of 2024 there have been a number of new builds and renovations within the site with new tennis courts, classrooms and renovated facilities. It also has around 50 classrooms with multiple ICT suites, a 10,000 book library, a large sports hall and refectory.

Previously a voluntary aided school administered by Hertfordshire County Council, in September 2021, St Mary's converted to the academy status. The school was a founding member of the St Francis of Assisi Catholic Academy Trust. It continues to be a Catholic school under the jurisdiction of the Roman Catholic Diocese of Westminster.

The school celebrated its 125th anniversary on the 10th of May 2022 by a special mass led by Bishop Paul McAleenan.

== Present day ==
There are approximately 1150 students and around 115 staff members.

== Notable alumni ==
- Sophie Austin (b. 1984) - actress
- Sam Smith (b. 1992) - singer-songwriter
