= Morris Ernst =

American attorney (1888–1976)

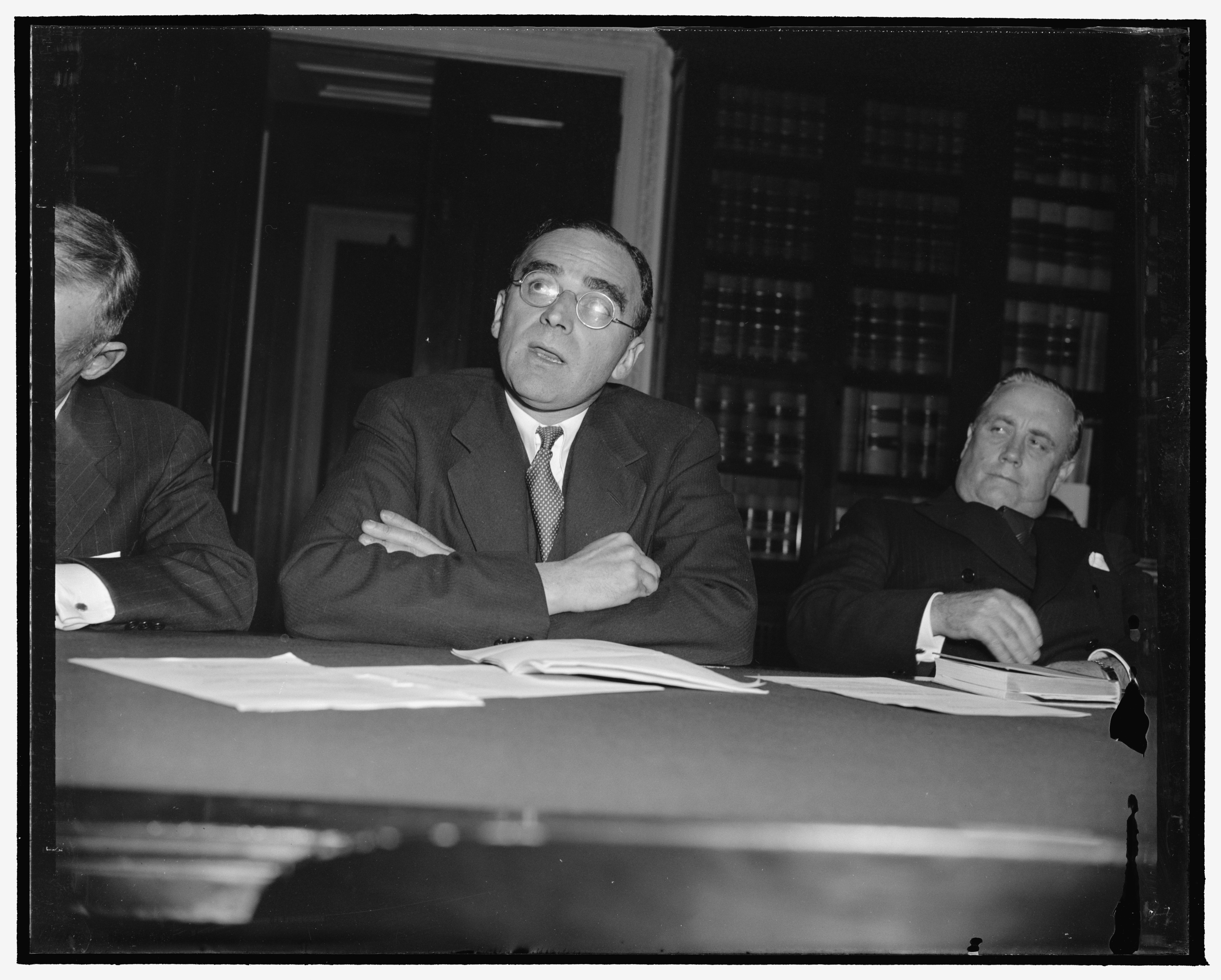
- Born: Morris Leopold Ernst; August 23, 1888; Uniontown, Alabama, U.S.
- Died: May 21, 1976 (aged 87); New York City, U.S.
- Education: Williams College; New York Law School
- Occupation: Attorney
- Known for: Civil liberties litigation

Morris Leopold Ernst (August 23, 1888 – May 21, 1976) was an American lawyer and prominent attorney for the American Civil Liberties Union (ACLU). In public life, he defended and asserted the rights of Americans to privacy and freedom from censorship, playing a significant role in challenging and overcoming the banning of certain works of literature (including James Joyce's Ulysses and Radclyffe Hall's The Well of Loneliness) and in asserting the right of media employees to organize labor unions. He also promoted an anti-communist stance within the ACLU itself, and was a member of the President's Committee on Civil Rights.

== Background ==
Morris Leopold Ernst was born in Uniontown, Alabama, on August 23, 1888, into a Jewish family. His father, Carl Ernst, had been born in Plzeň, Bohemia (in what is now the Czech Republic), and had worked as a peddler and shopkeeper; while his mother, Sarah Bernheim, was the daughter of German immigrants and had graduated from Hunter College. The family moved to New York when Morris was two, and lived in several locations in Manhattan where Carl ran a general store. Morris attended the Horace Mann School and graduated from Williams College in Williamstown, Massachusetts, in 1909. He studied law at night at New York Law School where he graduated in 1912 and was admitted to the New York bar in 1913.

== Career ==
Ernst practiced law in New York City and in 1915 co-founded the law firm of Greenbaum, Wolff & Ernst. He joined the board of the American Civil Liberties Union (ACLU) in 1927 and was one of the most prominent and successful ACLU attorneys from the 1920s through the 1960s. From 1929 to 1954, he shared the title of general counsel at the ACLU with Arthur Garfield Hays. He became vice chairman of the ACLU's board in 1955.

During the 1930s, Ernst played a significant role in challenging and relaxing existing censorship around the topics of sexual education and birth control, exonerating the sexual education manuals of Marie Stopes and Mary Ware Dennett, as well as legally representing Margaret Sanger and Hannah Stone and defending Life magazine over a photographic essay related to the film The Birth of a Baby. Ernst displayed considerable skill at harnessing the media to publicise and foreground his cases and initiatives, as well as his ability to educate a courtroom audience (and, frequently, its legal staff) on the topics in question. Also during this period, Ernst enjoyed the first of a succession of parallel civic appointments when he was appointed in 1932 (by then Governor of New York Franklin Roosevelt) to the State Banking Board, where he participated in the drafting of the Glass-Steagall Act of 1933.

In 1933, on behalf of Random House, he successfully defended James Joyce's novel Ulysses against obscenity charges in the case of United States v. One Book Called Ulysses, leading to the book's publication in the U.S. He won similar cases on behalf of Radclyffe Hall's The Well of Loneliness and Arthur Schnitzler's Casanova's Homecoming.

In 1937, as attorney for the American Newspaper Guild, he argued successfully in the Supreme Court that it should uphold the constitutionality of the National Labor Relations Act (the Wagner Act) as applied to the press. The case established the right of media employees to organize labor unions.

By the early 1940s, Ernst was leaving the pursuit of individual cases behind in favor of committee work, legal education and liaison with state representatives. He had also developed, since the late 1930s, a distrust of communism and was a strong supporter of J. Edgar Hoover and the FBI, even going so far as to pass on confidential letters and ACLU documents to Hoover. In 1940, as head of the ACLU, he agreed to bar communists from employment there and even discouraged their membership, basing his position on a distinction between the rights of the individual and the rights of groups. During the 1950s, he would actively defend the FBI from criticism of its investigative methods and growing civic power.

Ernst counted Justice Louis Brandeis as a close friend and later had close personal relationships with Presidents Franklin Roosevelt and Harry Truman and New York Governor Herbert Lehman. Besides politicians, he also was friendly with many cultural figures, including Edna Ferber, E. B. White, Groucho Marx, Michael Foot, Compton Mackenzie, Al Capp, Charles Addams, Grandma Moses, Heywood Broun, and Margaret Bourke-White.

In 1946, Truman appointed Ernst to the President's Committee on Civil Rights.

In 1956, Jesús Galíndez, a critic of the regime of Rafael Trujillo in the Dominican Republic, disappeared, abducted from New York City, it was charged, by Trujillo's agents. Hired by Trujillo to investigate the affair, Ernst's resulting report cleared the Trujillo regime of involvement in Galindez's disappearance, but the FBI and the press remained unconvinced.

== Personal life ==
In 1912, he married Susan Leerburger, with whom he had a son (who died in infancy) and a daughter. Susan died in 1922. Ernst married Margaret Samuels in 1923, and together they had a son and a daughter. Margaret died in 1964. Ernst kept a summer home on Nantucket, Massachusetts, and enjoyed sailing small boats. He died at home in New York City on May 21, 1976. He was survived by his son, both daughters, and five grandchildren.

Morris Ernst's papers are housed at the Harry Ransom Center at the University of Texas at Austin.

== Published works ==
=== Authored ===
- Ernst, Morris L., If I Were a (Constitutional) Dictator (January 13, 1932)
- Hold your tongue!: Adventures in Libel and Slander (1932)
- America's Primer (1931)
- The Ultimate Power (1937)
- Too Big (1940)
- Foreword to Ulysses (1942)
- The Best is Yet: Reflections of an Irrepressible Man (1945)
- The First Freedom (1946)
- So Far, So Good (1948)
- Report on the American Communist (1952)
- Touch Wood: A Year's Diary (1960)
- Untitled: The Diary of my 72nd Year (1962)
- The Pandect of C.L.D. (1965)
- The teacher, (editor, 1967)
- The Comparative International Almanac (1967)
- A Love Affair with the Law (1968)
- Utopia 1976 (1969)
- The Great Reversals: Tales of the Supreme Court (1973)

=== Co-author or contributor ===
- with William Seagle, To the Pure: A Study of Obscenity And the Censor (1928)
- with Pare Lorentz, Censored: The Private Life of the Movies (1930)
- with Alexander Lindey Hold Your Tongue!: Adventures in Libel and Slander (1932)
- contributor to Sex in the Arts (1932)
- contributor to The Sex Life of the Unmarried Adult (1934)
- with Alexander Lindey The Censor Marches On: Recent Milestones in the Administration of the Obscenity Law in the United States (1940)
- with David Loth American Sexual Behavior and the Kinsey Report (1948)
- with David Loth The People Know Best: The Ballot vs. the Poll (Washington: Public Affairs Press, 1949)
- Introduction to This Deception, The Story of a Woman Agent, by Hede Massing (1951)
- with David Loth, For Better Or Worse: New Approach to Marriage & Divorce (1952)
- with Alexander Lindy, Hold Your Tongue! The Layman's Guide to Libel and Slander (1950)
- with David Loth, Report on the American Communist (1952, 1962)
- with Alan Schwartz Privacy: The Right to be Let Alone (1962)
- with Alan Schwartz Censorship: The Search for the Obscene (1964)
- with David Loth How High Is Up?: Modern Law for Modern Man (1964)
- with Alan Schwarz Lawyers and What They Do (1965)
- with Eleanora B. Black Triple Cross Tricks (1968)
- with Malcolm A. Hoffmann Back and Forth: An Occasional, Casual Communication (1969)
- with David Loth The Taming of Technology (1972)
- contributor to Newsbreak (1974)
