= Neebe =

Neebe is a surname. Notable people with the surname include:

- Oscar Neebe (1850–1916), American anarchist and labor activist
- Paul Neebe (fl. from 2003), American classical trumpeter

== See also ==
- Neeb, another surname
