= Betsy DiSalvo =

American professor (born 1969)

Elizabeth DiSalvo
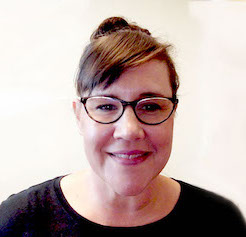
- Born: 1969 (age 56–57)
- Education: Georgia Tech; University of Dallas
- Scientific career
- Fields: Computer science; Learning sciences
- Workplaces: Georgia Tech
- Thesis: Glitch Game Testers: The design and study of a learning environment for computational production with young African American males (2012)
- Doctoral advisor: Amy S. Bruckman
- Website: betsydisalvo.com

Elizabeth "Betsy" DiSalvo (born 1969) is an American professor and Interim Chair at the Georgia Institute of Technology School of Interactive Computing. She is known for her research on informal learning, the impact of cultural values on technology use and production, computer science education, and the learning sciences.

== Career ==
In 2012, DiSalvo graduated from the Georgia Institute of Technology School of Interactive Computing and began work as an assistant professor in the same school. In 2018, DiSalvo was promoted to the position of associate professor. She is founder and director of the Culture and Technology Lab (CAT Lab) at Georgia Tech, which established a range of research programs focused on using participate design methods to inform informal learning and families in minority communities. Much of her work focuses on science, technology, engineering, and mathematics education with an emphasis on computer science. DiSalvo has also continued to work in game studies and looks at race and masculinity as part of play practices.

DiSalvo ran the Glitch Game Testers program, which introduced young Black men to technology careers through entry-level work as game testers, from 2009 to 2012. In a similar work training model, she launched the DataWorks program in 2020 to introduce young people from minority communities to entry-level work as "data wranglers" in data science.

DiSalvo was named a Georgia Tech Serve-Learn-Sustain Smart Cities and Connected Communities Fellow in 2017, received a Lockheed Inspirational Young Faculty Award in 2014, and received Honorable Mention for Outstanding Dissertation in the Georgia Tech College of Computing in 2012.

DiSalvo completed an undergraduate degree at the University of Dallas in Fine Art in 1991. She has continued to exhibit and work with cultural institutions on public engagement projects such as the Kitchen Lab Walker Art Center.
