= Orpheion =

Hillside theatre in Texas

The "Orpheion", also known as the Orpheion Theater, is a traditional outdoor Greek hillside theater on the Irving, Texas, campus of the University of Dallas.

The name is a Greek diminutive of Orpheus, the poet and musician of classical mythology who through his music and art could charm even the mute stones and trees to life.

The space consists of a bowl of earth, part-natural and part-man-made, (in Greek the "theatron" or 'seeing place' for the spectators to sit) that half-encircles, at the base of the bowl, a nearly circular (actually octagonal) stone stage (the "orchestra" or 'the place where the chorus dances'). Abutting the rear of the stage, in size and form variant on the needs of the particular production, is a temporary wooden structure (the "skene" or 'tent' where the Greek actors could enter and exit, and probably also change masks and costumes, etc.). This structure often holds a curtain or curtains for thespian ingress and egress. Behind the skene is a copse of oak trees, with paths for the actors and crew.

== Inspiration ==
The inspiration for such an outdoor hillside theater came from the University of Dallas Rome Program, the semester study-abroad during which students, usually sophomores, live and study on the "Due Santi" campus, southeast of Rome. This campus, purchased by the University of Dallas in 1990, included a natural hillside between what is now the dormitory and the cappuccino bar; the campus architects built this slope into a roughly semi-circular stone outdoor theater, commonly (though erroneously) termed the "Amphitheater." ("Amphitheaters" are actually fully enclosed ellipses, like the famed Amphitheatrum Flavium, better known as the Coliseum.) The Rome Campus was officially inaugurated June 1994, and each fall and spring thereafter the campus has housed around a hundred students, plus faculty, staff, and their families.

To complement and bring to life the Greek and Shakespearean plays that they read for class, University of Dallas students regularly stage full-length plays and shorter vignettes in this outdoor 'amphitheater.' Further, as part of the official Rome Program, the students travel to Greece for ten days, where they visit, and often perform readings in, such outdoor theaters such as the Theater of Dionysos in Athens, the Theater in Delphi, and the Theater of Epidaurus. During their own independent travels, students have also visited the many still-standing Greco-Roman theaters spread throughout the Mediterranean: in Syracuse, Sicily, Segesta, Taormina, Gubbio, Verona, Pompeii, Ostia Antica, and Hadrian's Villa.

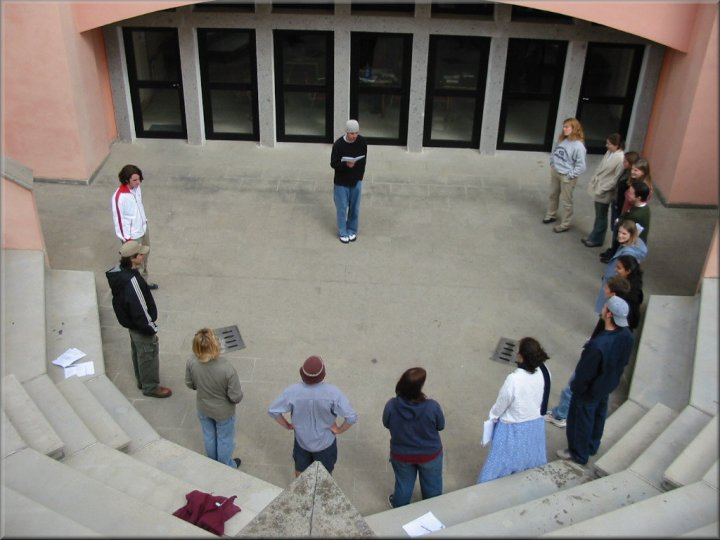
A view of the Rome Campus theater from the audience looking onto the stage, with student actors rehearsing, Spring 2002

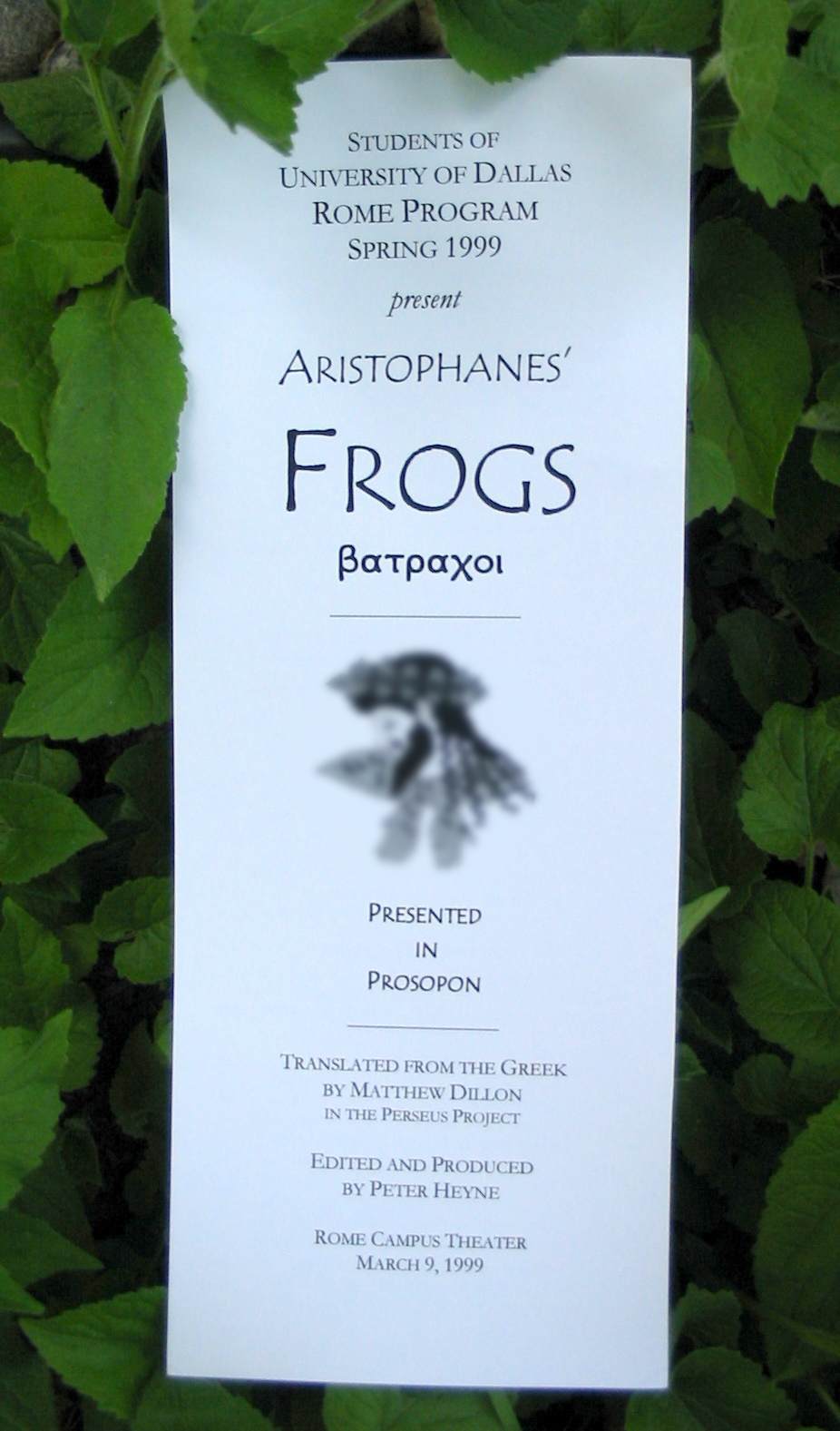
The front of the program for the student production of The Frogs, Spring 1999

Inspired by the hillside theaters of Greece and Rome, students returned to their hilly campus in Irving, Texas, in the area called Las Colinas (the "hills" in Spanish), and there they planned to recreate outdoor classical theater. Several hills on the campus were considered—for instance, the hill between the Church of the Incarnation and Jerome Hall—but all have flaws: e.g., the audience would have to look directly into the setting sun, there was too much exposure to foot and road traffic, there was not a steep enough slope, there was no ready access to power and water, and so forth. From the fall of 1999 until the late spring and summer of 2003, the idea lay dormant.

== Construction ==
In June 2003, University of Dallas students (undergraduate and graduate), alumni, faculty, and Facilities and Grounds staff formed a joint enterprise to design and construct the new outdoor theater. They selected an area between the Braniff building and the Facilities building, which had been a neglected corner of campus, a dumping ground for rubble and rebar piled up over years to shore up the Facilities parking lot. The team reclaimed the former dump and transformed the area into a lush green space, with new sod, trees, sprinkler and drainage system. The crew, mostly student volunteers, worked through the torrid Texas summer to lay sod, trim and transplant trees, pack down limestone base, lay down the stage bricks, tear out poison ivy, and more.

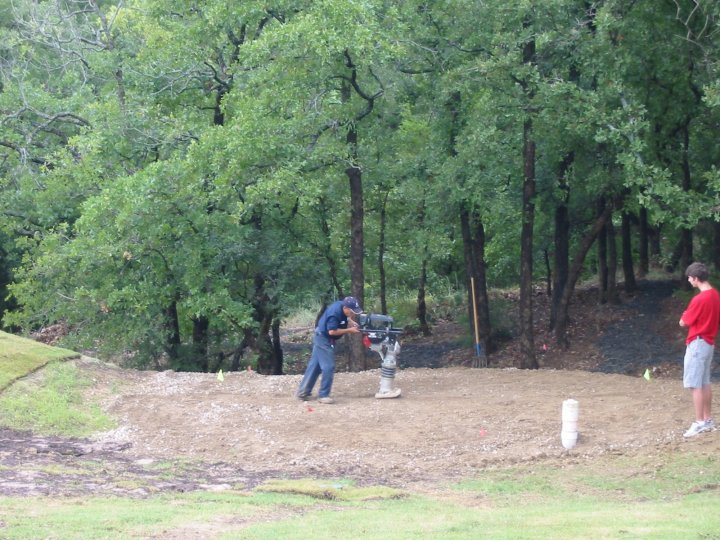
A Facilities crew member and the "whacker packer"

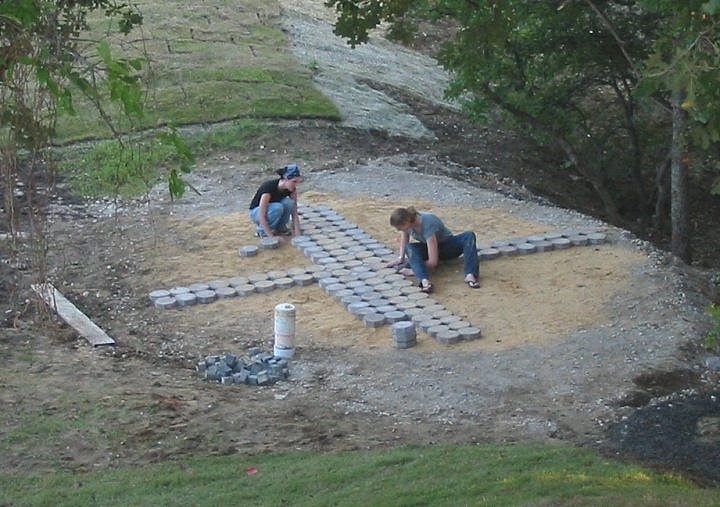
Two students laying the stage bricks

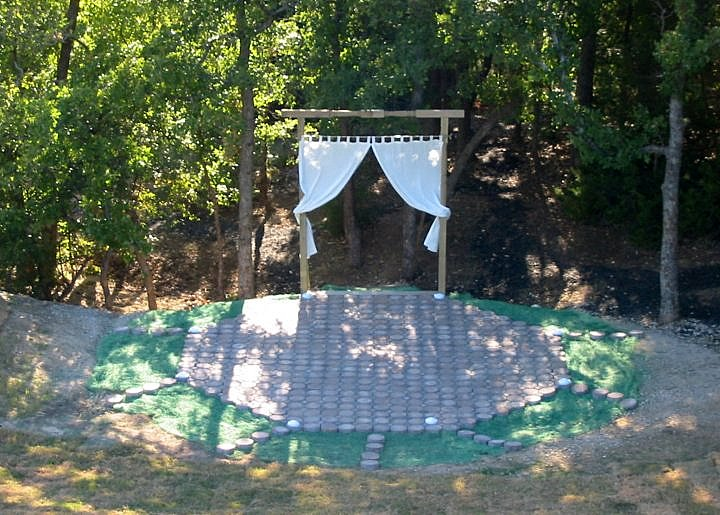
The finished stage, ready for the inauguration

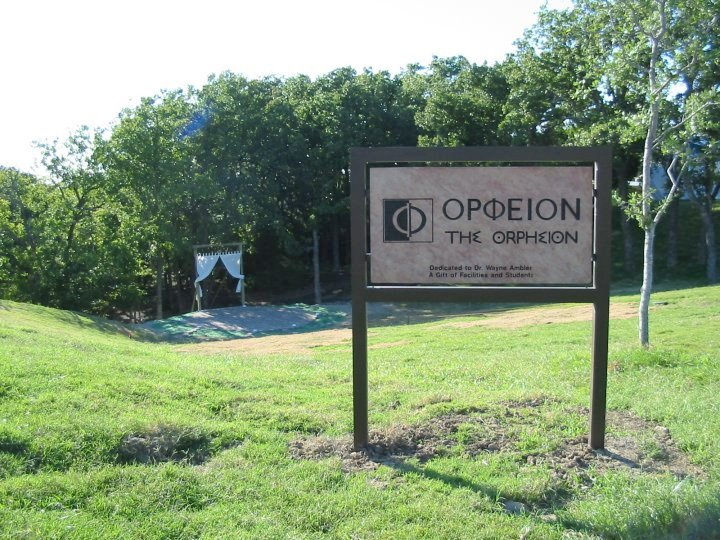
The finished theater, with the new engraved stone sign

By the end of summer, the space was ready for the inauguration, which took place on September 26, 2003, as faculty dedicated the space to the former Dean of the Rome Campus, who had been an ardent sponsor of outdoor student drama. The theater then opened with a student-led revival of Shakespeare's classical comedy, A Midsummer Night's Dream (students had originally staged the play on the Rome Campus during the spring of 2002). The stage setting was simple: a post and lintel with two curtains. Over the three night run, approximately 500 total students, faculty, alumni, families, and friends sat on the green hillside and watched the play.

In the summer of 2004, in preparation of the fall play, Shakespeare's madcap comedy Twelfth Night, crews of students and Facilities staff added a "French drain" and more backstage limestone base (to prevent erosion and make entry onto the stage from backstage safer and easier). Students also built a much more elaborate scene house, with three (rather than just one) stage entrances, a balcony, and ramps.

In the fall of 2021, after a long period of disuse, director Stefan Novinski revamped the Orpheion for the mainstage production of Shakespeare's Roman comedy, Comedy of Errors. A raised stage of wooden platforms was constructed over the eroded area, with paths cut through the woods to the nearby Facilities building, which was used as a backstage area.

In May of 2025 to prepare for the next Fall's Mainstage Mark Kirk rebuilt the Orpheion as its predecessor was rotted and unsafe to walk on. The renovated Orpheion was made larger in size, better weather-proofed and the paths backstage were replaced with fresh wood.

== Student productions ==
- A Midsummer Night's Dream by William Shakespeare, Fall 2003
- Hamlet by William Shakespeare, Spring 2004
- Twelfth Night, or What You Will by William Shakespeare, with accompanying student-faculty symposium, Fall 2004
- The Winter's Tale by William Shakespeare, with accompanying student-faculty symposium, Spring 2005
- Lysistrata by Aristophanes, Spring 2005
- Much Ado About Nothing by William Shakespeare, with accompanying student-faculty symposium, Fall 2005
- King Lear by William Shakespeare, Fall 2005
- Peter Pan by J.M. Barrie, Fall 2006
- Antigone by Sophocles, Fal06
- The Code of the Woosters by P.G. Wodehouse, Spring 2007
- Comedy of Errors by William Shakespeare, Fall 2021
- A Midsummer Night's Dream by William Shakespeare, Fall 2025
