= Joseph Kelly (academic) =

American academic

Joseph Patrick Kelly is an American scholar, editor, and professor of English at the College of Charleston. He earned his B.A. from the University of Dallas and received his M.A. in English and Ph.D. in English in 1992 from the University of Texas, Austin. Kelly was born in 1962 and resides in Charleston, South Carolina.

== Scholar and professor ==
Kelly is the Director of Irish and Irish American Studies at the College of Charleston. He joined the faculty in 1992 and is a tenured professor teaching modern British literature, Irish literature, composition, biography and autobiography, and Honors western civilization. In addition to chairing numerous faculty committees, Kelly was director of the masters program (2003-2007), Speaker of the Faculty (2007-2010), and is currently a Senator for the School of Humanities and Social Sciences and co-director of the President's Diversity Commission.

His research interests include Modern British Literature, Irish Literature, biography, and South Carolina history.

His book Our Joyce: From Outcast to Icon was published in 1998, and he has written critical articles on James Joyce and presented at the American Conference for Irish Studies.

In addition to his interests in modern British fiction, he conducts research in antebellum South Carolina history and published “Henry Laurens and the Southern Man of Conscience” in the South Carolina Historical Magazine. Kelly has been an active member of the faculty senate and has served as a Western Civilization professor for the Honors Program.

Kelly has also authored three books on American history and democracy:

- The Biggest Lie: The Prehistory of American Fascism, 1818-1915. Published 2026 (Hardback). Bloomsbury Publishing.
- Marooned: Jamestown, Shipwreck, and a New History of America's Origin. Published 2018 (Hardback), 2019 (Paperback). Bloomsbury Publishing.
- America's Longest Siege: Charleston, Slavery, and the Slow March Toward Civil War. Published 2013 (Ebook), ABRAMS Press.

== Editor ==
Kelly edited the five-volume Seagull Reader series for W.W. Norton. Each volume offers introductory material and anthology reading appropriate for composition and literature classes. The collection includes Seagull Reader: Essays, Seagull Reader: Poetry, Seagull Reader: Plays, Seagull Reader: Stories, and Seagull Reader: Literature.
