= Michael Neeb =

American businessman

- Born: Michael Thomas Neeb; August 1962 (age 63)
- Education: Baylor University; University of Dallas
- Occupation: businessman
- Title: CEO, HCA Healthcare UK
- Term: 2007-2019
- Spouse: Amy Neeb
- Children: 2

Michael Thomas Neeb (born August 1962) is an American businessman, the president and CEO of HCA Healthcare UK since 2007 until 2019.

== Early life ==
Michael Thomas Neeb was born in August 1962. He earned a bachelor's degree in accounting from Baylor University in 1984 and a master's degree in business administration from the University of Dallas in 1998.

== Career ==
Neeb joined HCA in 1991, moved to the UK in 2000 as CFO for its international division, and became president and CEO in 2007.

In 1999, Neeb was acquitted of charges of "defrauding federal health care programs through the submission of bogus expense claims", but two of his colleagues, Jay Jarrell and Robert Whiteside, were found guilty.

The convictions of Jarrell and Whiteside were reversed on appeal, as the accounting treatment in question was not considered unreasonable.

== Personal life ==
Neeb is married to Amy, and they have two children.
