= Sisters of St. Mary of Namur =

Roman Catholic religious order

- Abbreviation: S.S.M.N
- Formation: 1819; 207 years ago
- Founder: Fr. Nicholas Minsart
- Type: Catholic religious order
- Headquarters: Namur, Belgium
- Superior General: Sr. Nicole Kingsley

The Congregation of the Sisters of St. Mary of Namur is a Roman Catholic religious order established in Namur, Belgium.

== History ==
The Congregation of the Sisters of St. Mary of Namur was established in Namur, Belgium on November 11, 1819, by Father Nicholas Minsart with the help of Josephine Sana and Elizabeth Berger. They started their congregation by giving sewing classes to the young women. Soon the congregation started spreading. St Mary's Catholic School, Bishop's Stortford, was founded by the Sisters of Namur.

== In the United States ==
The Sisters of St. Mary reached the United States in 1863 in order to serve American Indians, but, due to the Civil War, were not able to continue their work. However, they managed to establish a school in New York. The Western Province of the Sisters of St. Mary was established in 1921. Today, sisters are spread throughout the world and serving poor and needy; the main focus of the Sisters is on education. The Sisters in the Western United States founded the University of Dallas.

== Worldwide ==
The congregation also has mission houses in Brazil and Africa.
