= Test case (law) =

Case brought to set a legal precedent

In case law, a test case is a lawsuit whose purpose is to establish an important legal principle or right and to set a precedent. Test cases are brought to court with the intention of challenging, interpreting, or receiving clarification on a present law, regulation, or constitutional principle. Government agencies sometimes bring test cases to confirm or expand their powers. The outcome of test cases has a wide public significance as it shapes future rulings.

== Examples ==
Examples of influential test cases include:

1. Plessy v. Ferguson (1896)
2. Tennessee v. Scopes (1925)
3. United States v. One Book Called Ulysses (1933)
4. Brown v. Board of Education (1954)
5. Griswold v. Connecticut (1965)
6. Oneida Indian Nation of N.Y. State v. Oneida County (1974)
7. Adams v Cape Industries plc (1990)
8. Mabo v Queensland (No 2) (1992)
9. National Westminster Bank plc v Spectrum Plus Limited (2005)
10. District of Columbia v. Heller (2008)

== See also ==
- Case of first impression
- Leading case
- Uncommon Law, or Misleading Cases in the Common Law, by A. P. Herbert; still further misleading case
