= Eugene Curtsinger =

American novelist

Eugene Cleveland Curtsinger, Jr.
- Born: January 4, 1924
- Died: October 22, 2008 (aged 84)
- Education: University of Notre Dame
- Occupations: Professor; academic administrator; novelist
- Employer: University of Dallas
- Spouse: Barbara Ann Kellogg
- Children: 5

Eugene Curtsinger (January 4, 1924 – October 22, 2008) was an American literary scholar, academic administrator and novelist. He began his career at Marquette University and taught at the University of Dallas for five decades, where he was the founding dean and the chair of its English department. He authored eight novels.

== Selected works ==
- Curtsinger, E. C. (1985). Secrets of Siena. Fort Worth, Texas: Latitudes Press. OCLC 1036939767.
- Curtsinger, E. C. (1987). The Muse of Henry James. Mansfield, Texas: Latitudes Press. ISBN 9780941179010. OCLC 891211200.
- Curtsinger, E. C. (1988). Towers, Crosses: A Novel. Mansfield, Texas: Latitudes Press. OCLC 707584990.
- Curtsinger, E. C. (1992). Segoviana: A Novel. Mansfield, Texas: Latitudes Press. ISBN 9780941179409. OCLC 25830990.
- Curtsinger, E. C. (1996). Swimming To The Moon: A Novel. Mansfield, Texas: Latitudes Press. ISBN 9780941179423. OCLC 34045833.
- Curtsinger, E. C. (2000). Strychnine and Ceremony: A Novel. Bloomington, Indiana: 1st Books Library. ISBN 9781585001781. OCLC 62457961.
