= University of Dallas =

Catholic university in Irving, Texas, US

- Motto: Veritatem, Justitiam Diligite
- Motto in English: Love Ye Truth and Justice
- Type: Private university
- Established: 1956
- Religious affiliation: Roman Catholic
- Academic affiliations: ACCU; CIC; NAICU
- Endowment: $98.3 million (2024)
- Chancellor: Edward J. Burns
- President: Jonathan J. Sanford
- Students: 2,076 (fall 2024)
- Undergraduates: 1,444 (fall 2024)
- Postgraduates: 632 (fall 2024)
- Location: Irving, Texas, United States; 32.8451074°N 96.925807°W
- Campus: Urban; 744 acres (301 hectares)
- Other campuses: Marino, Lazio
- Colors: Navy and white
- Nickname: Crusaders
- Sporting affiliations: NCAA Division III – SCAC (non-football)
- Website: udallas.edu
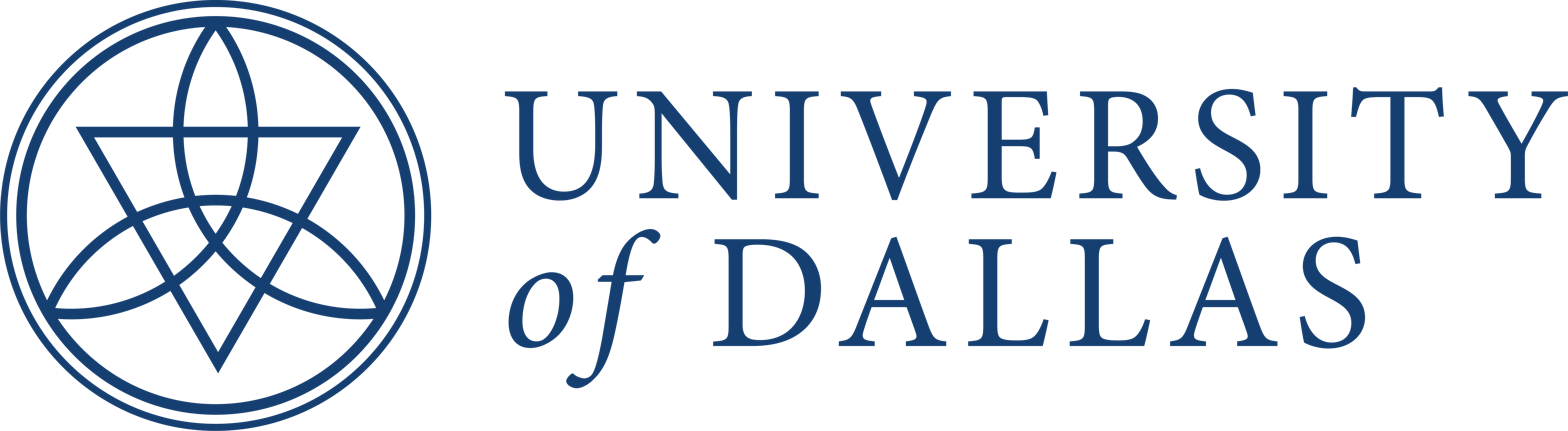

The University of Dallas is a private Catholic university in Irving, Texas, United States. Established in 1956, it is accredited by the Southern Association of Colleges and Schools.

The university comprises three academic units: the Braniff Graduate School of Liberal Arts, the Constantin College of Liberal Arts, and the Satish & Yasmin Gupta College of Business. Dallas offers several master's degree programs and a doctoral degree program with three concentrations. As of 2017, there were 136 full-time faculty and 102 part-time faculty.

== History ==
=== 20th century ===
The University of Dallas' charter dates from 1910 when the Western Province of the Congregation of the Mission (Vincentians) renamed Holy Trinity College in Dallas, which they had founded in 1905. The provincial of the Western Province closed the university in 1928, and the charter reverted to the Diocese of Dallas. In 1955, the Western Province of the Sisters of St. Mary of Namur obtained it to create a new higher education institution in Dallas that would subsume their junior college, Our Lady of Victory College, located in Fort Worth. The sisters, together with Eugene Constantin Jr. and Edward R. Maher Sr., petitioned the Diocese of Dallas to sponsor the university, though ownership was entrusted to a self-perpetuating independent board of trustees. The university opened with an initial class of ninety-six students in 1956.

The university's character was intended to be unlike other Catholic universities in Texas. Bishop Thomas Gorman had plans to shape it in the manner of Louvain, the Catholic university in Belgium where he himself had studied and which was considered an elite institution in his day.

The Sisters of St. Mary of Namur, Cistercian monks, Franciscan friars, and several lay professors formed the university's 1956 faculty. The Franciscans departed three years later; professors from the Order of Preachers (Dominicans) joined the faculty in 1958 and built St. Albert the Great Priory on campus. The Cistercians established Our Lady of Dallas Abbey in 1958 and Cistercian Preparatory School in 1962, which are both adjacent to campus. The School Sisters of Notre Dame arrived in 1962 and opened a school for children with learning difficulties in 1963 and a motherhouse for the Dallas Province in 1964, both on campus. The sisters moved the school to Dallas in 1985 and closed the motherhouse in 1987. The faculty is now primarily lay, but there are Cistercians, Dominican Sisters, and clerics on faculty.

Braniff Graduate School, the Graduate School of Management, and programs in art and English all began in 1966. In 1973, the Institute of Philosophic Studies, the doctoral program of the Braniff Graduate School and an outgrowth of the Kendall Politics and Literature Program, was initiated. The School of Ministry began in 1987. The College of Business, incorporating the Gupta Graduate School of Management and undergraduate business, opened in 2003.

Since the first class entered in 1960, university graduates have won 39 Fulbright awards.

Accreditation by the Southern Association of Colleges and Schools came in 1963 and has been reaffirmed regularly. In 1989, it was the youngest institution of higher education ever to be awarded a Phi Beta Kappa chapter.

=== 21st century ===
In 2021, the University named Johnathan J. Sanford as the 10th president of the University. He was hired in 2015 as dean of UD’s Constantin College after 13 years of teaching at Franciscan University of Steubenville. In 2018 he became provost, during which time he oversaw the development of the university’s strategic plan to shore up academic excellence, the school’s reputation, and community and Church involvement.

In 2013, the Princeton Review ranked the university as the 15th-most LGBT-unfriendly school in the United States. Two years later, the university applied for an exception to Title IX allowing it to discriminate based on gender identity for religious reasons. The university "cannot encourage individuals to live in conflict with Catholic principles," according to president Thomas Keefe.

President Thomas W. Keefe was hired from Benedictine University to serve as president. Like his predecessors, he quickly ran into controversy. In 2017, Keefe's leadership was strongly and publicly challenged by over half the faculty and thousands of alumni members of an independent alumni group called UD Alumni for Liberal Education. Their complaint was over a proposal to add a new college within the university that it was believed would have low standards. After intense controversy and multiple efforts by trustees, on Good Friday of 2018, after Keefe's extended and unexplained absence from work, the university's trustees voted to fire him, effective at the end of the academic year.

=== Seal ===
The outer circle of the university's seal is an alteration of verse 8:19 of the Book of Zechariah, "Veritatem tantum et pacem diligite", which means "Love truth and peace." The university's motto replaces pacem with justitiam, and so may be translated as "Love truth [and] justice." In the center of the seal is a Triquetra interwoven with a triangle as a double symbol of the Holy Trinity and a Fleur-de-lis which symbolizes the Cistercians. It also includes two crusader shields which depict the (left) Lone Star of Texas and (right) the torch of liberty and learning. The wavy lines near the bottom represent the Trinity River.

=== The role of the Cistercians ===
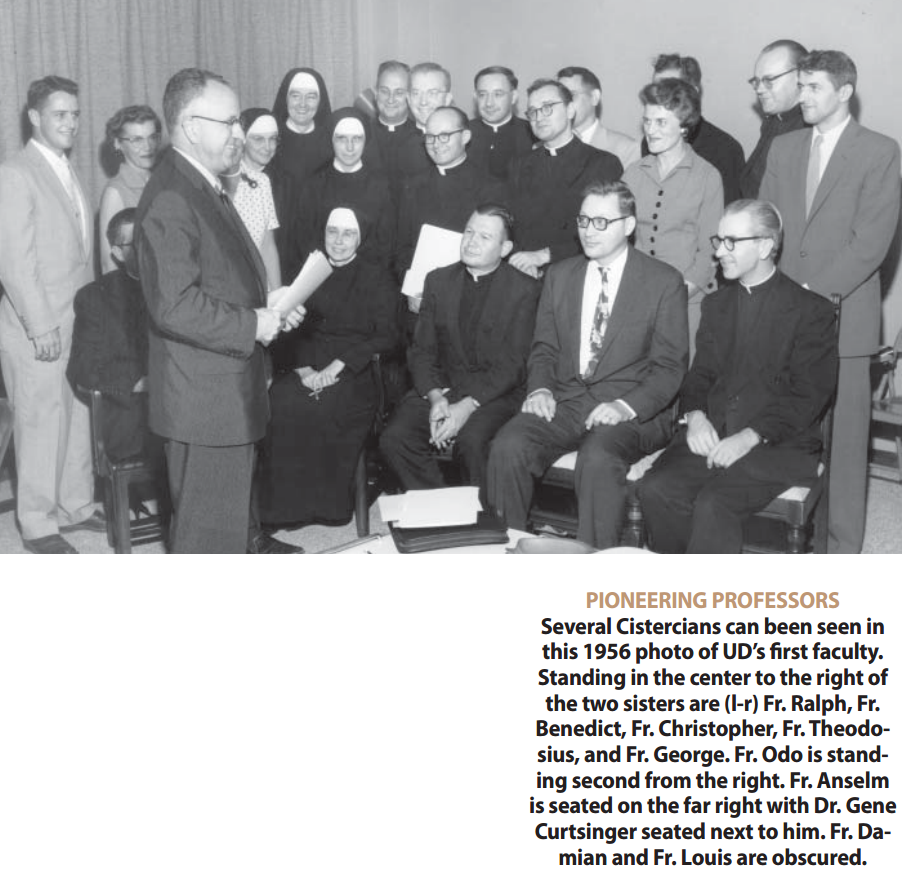
The founding faculty of the University of Dallas, including the nine Cistercian Fathers from Zirc, Hungary

Bishop Thomas Gorman wrote as early as 1954 to Abbot Anselm Nagy to ask the displaced Hungarian Cistercian fathers from the Monastery of Zirc to assist in founding the university. On the first day of classes in September 1956, nine Cistercian fathers, at that point half of the entire faculty, were employed at the new university. The history of UD is connected to both those founding Cistercian priests and many more Hungarians who taught there in the first decades.

=== Guadalupe art print scandal ===
On February 14, 2008, an image of Our Lady of Guadalupe was removed without permission from the Upper Gallery of the Haggerty Art Village. The image, Saint or Sinner, was on loan from Murray State University in Murray, Kentucky as part of a larger exhibit of works by Murray State students. The piece reportedly portrayed the Virgin Mary as a stripper.

After students voiced criticism, signs were put up to warn visitors that "some items [on display] might be considered offensive." The university's president, Frank Lazarus, publicly criticized the theft. Reaction to Lazarus' statement prompted heated campus discussion, and was discussed online on Catholic blogs and in conservative tabloids.

=== Student Leaders for Racial Solidarity ===
In 2020, an undergraduate submitted a proposal to establish a club called Student Leaders for Racial Justice. After heated debate on campus, the university administration eventually approved a revised version of the submission, leading to the establishment of the Student Leaders for Racial Solidarity Club.

== Governance and leadership ==
As of 2022, the president was Jonathan J. Sanford, a philosopher who previously served as the school's provost.

The University of Dallas is governed by a board of trustees. According to the university's by-laws, the bishop of Dallas is an ex-officio voting member.

Edward Burns, Bishop of the Diocese of Dallas, is the chancellor. The office, held by a Catholic bishop as stipulated by the constitution of the university, is an unpaid, honorary position.

Previous chancellors include:

- Thomas Kiely Gorman (1954–1969)
- Thomas Ambrose Tschoepe (1969–1990)
- Charles Victor Grahmann (1990–2007)
- Kevin J. Farrell (2008–2016)

Previous presidents include:

- F. Kenneth Brasted (1956–1959)
- Robert J. Morris (1960–1962)
- Donald A. Cowan (1962–1977)
- John R. Sommerfeldt (1978–1980)
- Robert F. Sasseen (1981–1995)
- Milam J. Joseph (1996–2003)
- Frank Lazarus (2004–2010)
- Thomas Keefe (2010–2018)
- Thomas S. Hibbs (2019–2021)

== Campus ==
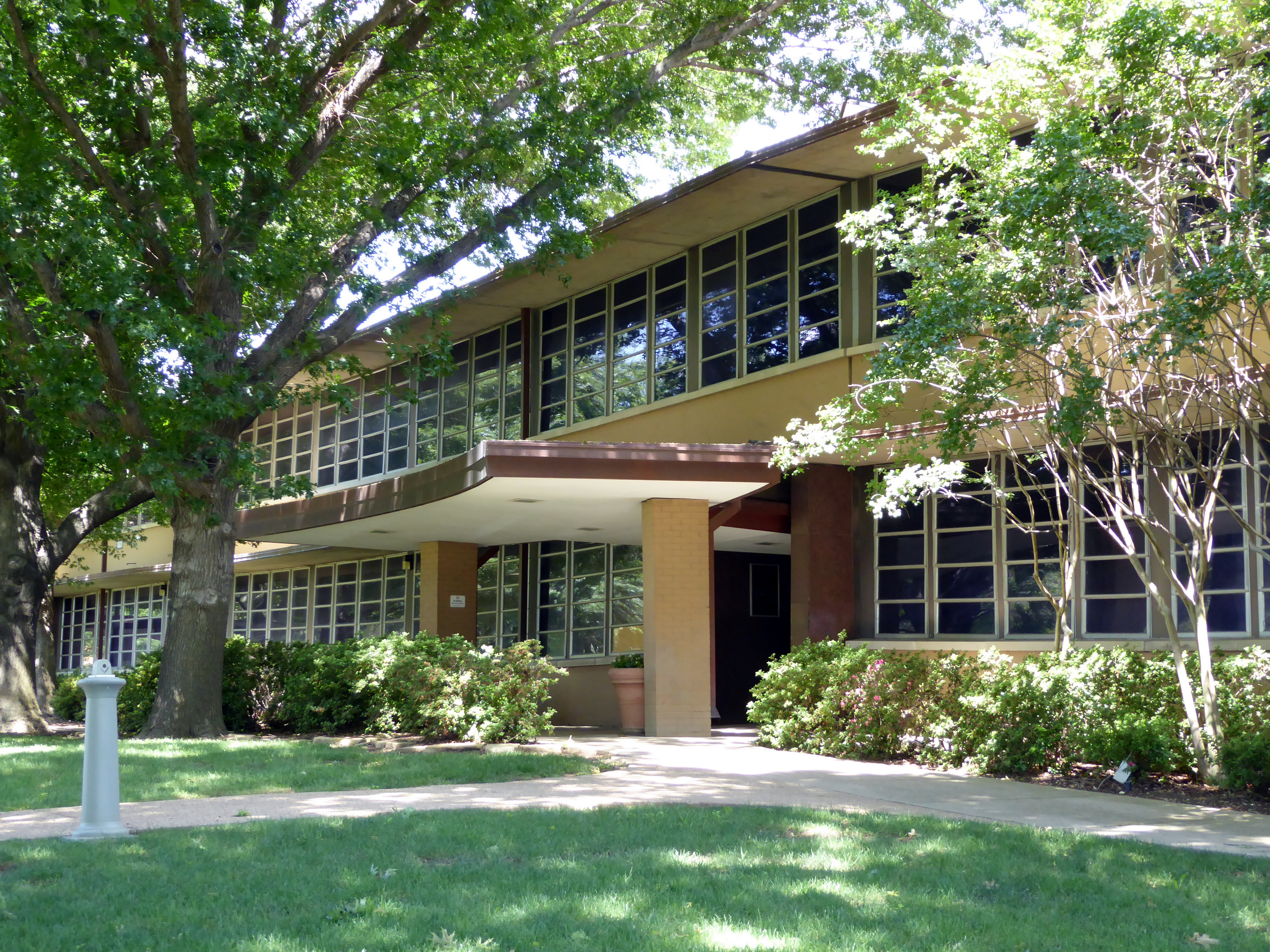
Carpenter Hall, one of the original buildings on the campus of the University of Dallas, before its demolition in 2018

The university is located in Irving, Texas, on a 744-acre (301 hectare) campus in the Dallas–Fort Worth metroplex. The Las Colinas development is nearby. It is 10 miles (16 km) from downtown Dallas. The campus consists mostly of mid-twentieth-century modernist, earth-toned brick buildings set amidst the native Texas landscape. Several of these buildings were designed by the well-known Texas architect O'Neil Ford, dubbed the Godfather of Texas modernism. The mall is the center of campus, with the 187.5 feet tall (57.15 meters) Braniff Memorial Tower as its focal point.

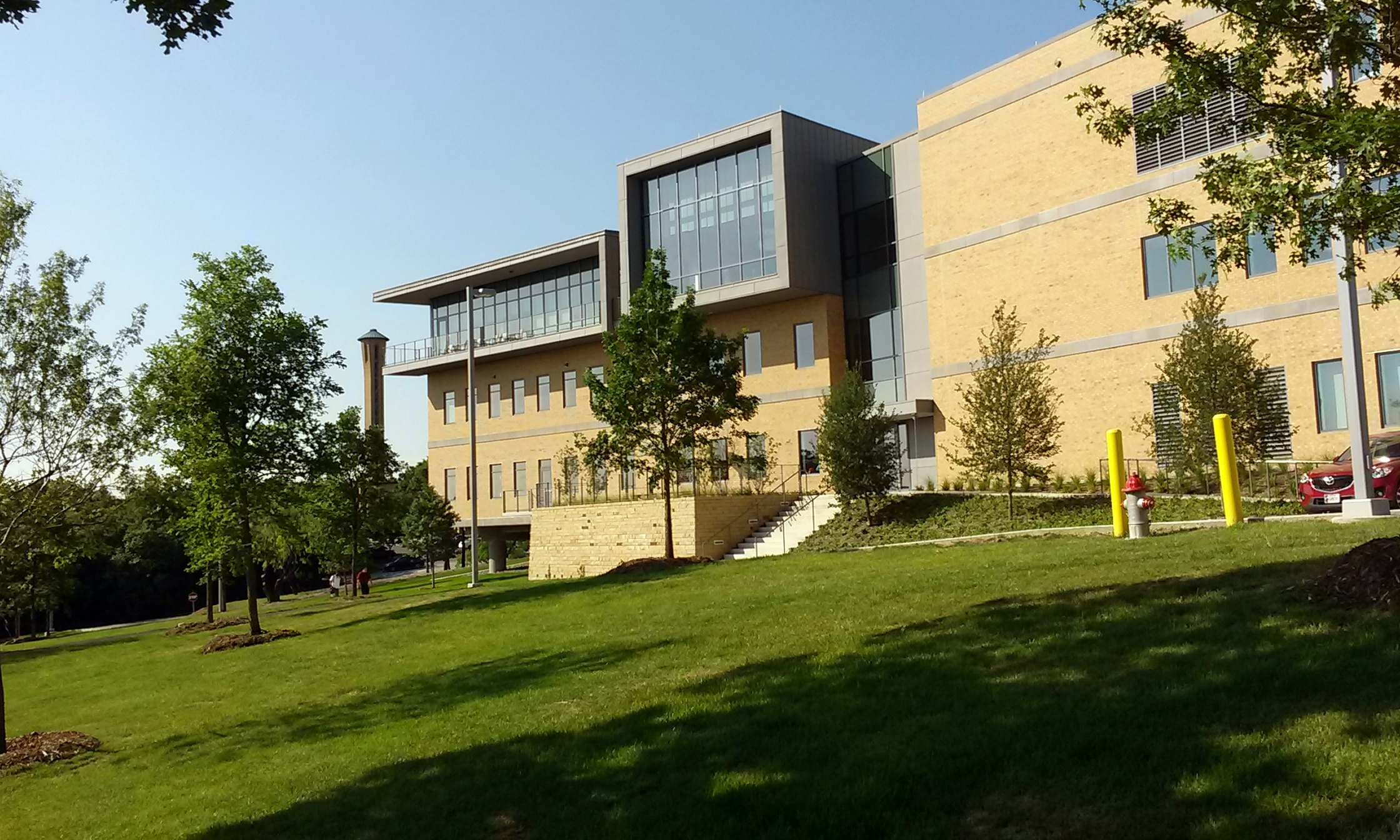
SB Hall on the University of Dallas campus, seen with the Braniff Tower in the background

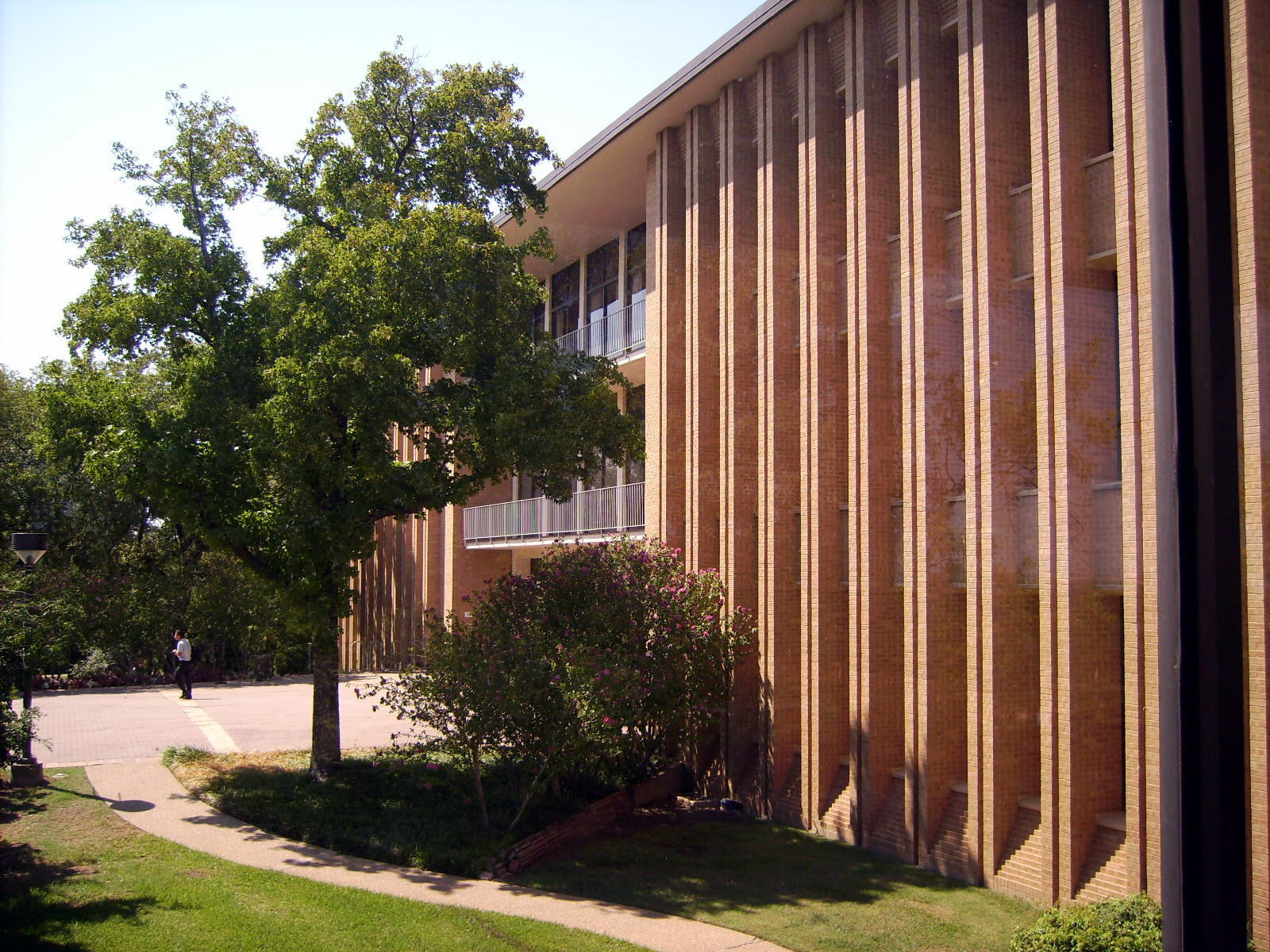
Braniff Graduate Center, designed by O'Neil Ford

The Princeton Review claimed the University of Dallas had the fourth-least beautiful campus among the America's top colleges and universities. Travel + Leisure's October 2013 issue lists it as one of America's ugliest college campuses, citing its "low-profile, boxy architecture that bears uncanny resemblance to a public car park," but noting that a recent $12 million donation from alumni Satish and Yasmin Gupta would bring new campus construction.

A Dallas Area Rapid Transit (DART) Orange Line light-rail station opened near campus on July 30, 2012.

The campus is home to the Orpheion Theatre, a small Greek-style performance space built into a hillside in 2003. Most plays are performed in the Drama Building.

=== Student newspaper ===
Names of the student paper since the first issue in 1957 have included The Shield, The Outgribe, The University News, and currently The Cor Chronicle.

== Enrollment ==
Undergraduate

- 1,447 students
- 55% in-state; 44% out-of-state; 1% international
- 98% full-time
- 56% female; 44% male
- 98% age 24 and under
- 74% Catholic
- 36% minority

The 2023–2024 estimated charges, including tuition, room, board, and fees, for full-time undergraduates is $65,240.

Graduate

- 1,042 students
- 41% minority
- 36% Catholic

== Academics ==
=== Core curriculum and traditional liberal education ===
The university has resisted a focus on "trades and job training" and pursued the traditional ideas of a liberal arts education according to the model described by John Henry Newman in The Idea of a University. Donald and Louise Cowan were instrumental in developing and implementing the university's "Core Curriculum," a collection of approximately twenty courses (two years) of common study covering philosophy, theology, history, literature, politics, economics, mathematics, science, art, and a foreign language. The curriculum includes a slate of required courses which cover specific texts, permitting professors to assume a common body of knowledge and speak across disciplines. Classes in these core subjects typically have an average class size of 16 students to permit frequent discussion. Dallas is one of 25 schools graded "A" by the American Council of Trustees and Alumni for a solid core curriculum.

There is a similar core curriculum for graduate studies in the Braniff Graduate School of Liberal Arts.

=== Undergraduate ===
Undergraduate students are enrolled in the Constantin College of Liberal Arts, the Satish & Yasmin Gupta College of Business, or the Ann & Joe O. Neuhoff School of Ministry. The university awards bachelors’ degrees in arts and sciences.

UD offers a five-year dual-degree program in electrical engineering in collaboration with The University of Texas at Arlington.

In 1970, the university started a study-abroad program in which Dallas students, generally sophomores, spend a semester at the university’s campus southeast of Rome in the Alban Hills along the Via Appia Nuova.

=== Graduate programs ===
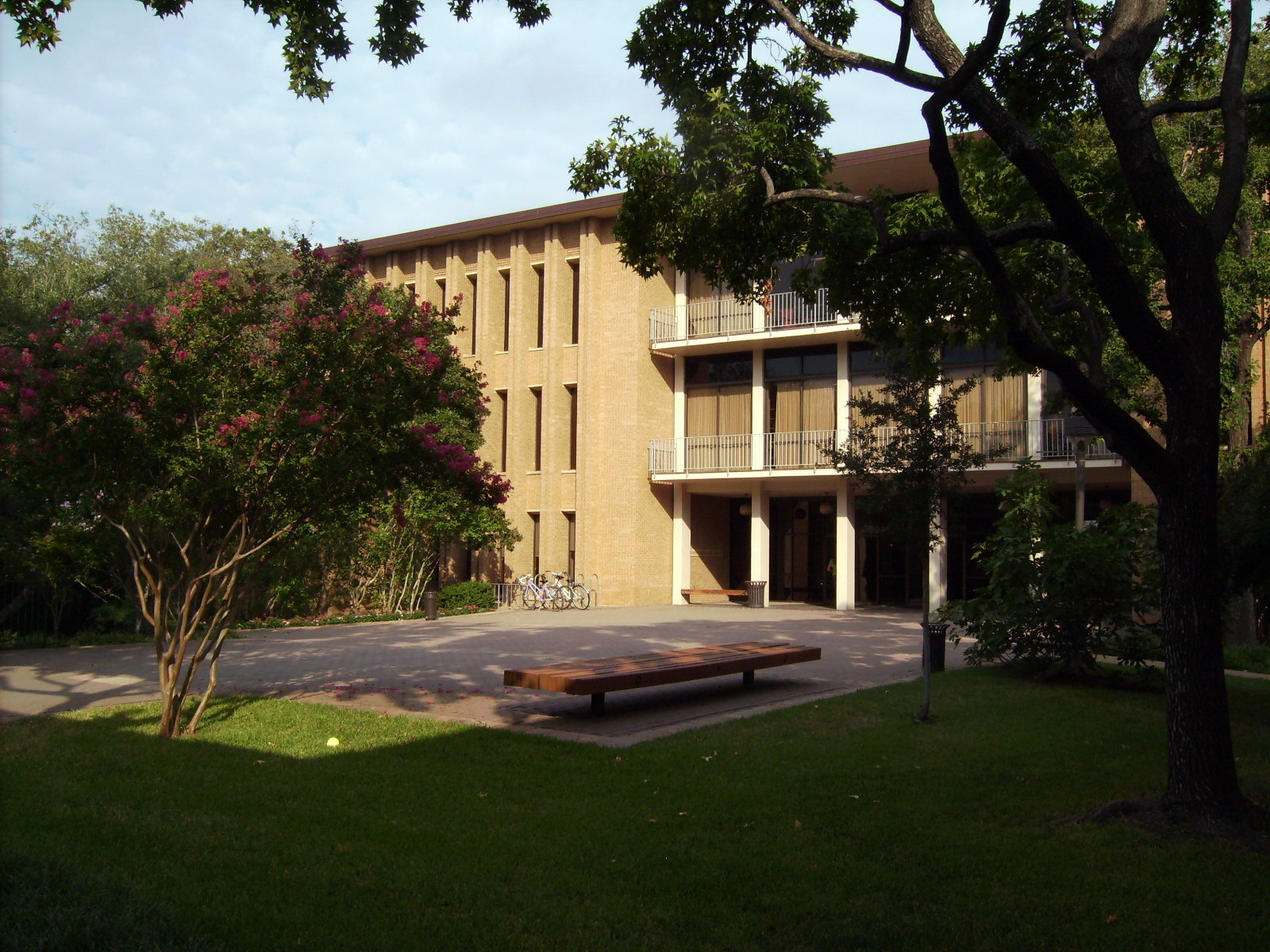
The Braniff Graduate Center on the campus of the University of Dallas, one of the buildings designed by Texas architect O'Neil Ford.

The Braniff Graduate School of Liberal Arts administers master's degrees in American Studies, art, English, humanities, philosophy, politics, psychology, and theology, as well as an interdisciplinary doctoral program with concentrations in English, philosophy, and politics.

The Satish and Yasmin Gupta College of Business is an AACSB-accredited business school offering a part-time MBA program for working professionals, a Master of Science program, a Doctor of Business Administration (DBA), Graduate Certificates, graduate preparatory programs, and professional development courses.

=== Rankings ===
Academic rankings

Master's
- Washington Monthly: 80

Regional
- U.S. News & World Report: 12 (West)

National
- Forbes: 225

Undergraduate

- Ranked No. 9 in the nation as the least LGBT friendly by Princeton Review in 2017 and 15th in 2018
- Ranked No. 12 among Western regional universities by U.S. News & World Report (2022 edition).
- Ranked No. 225 on Forbes' list of America's Best Colleges (2019 edition).
- Listed as one of the 126 best colleges in the Western United States by The Princeton Review in 2017.
- Endorsed by the Cardinal Newman Society, a conservative Catholic association.

Graduate

- The Department of Art was ranked No. 191 by the U.S. News & World Report's Best Graduate School Rankings 2016.

=== Research ===
The on-campus editorial offices of Dallas Medieval Texts and Translations published 21 volumes as of May, 2016.

=== Periodicals ===
The student weekly newspaper is The Cor Chronicle. The yearbook, first published in 1957, is titled The Crusader. Ramify, the official journal of the Braniff Graduate School of Liberal Arts, has been published since 2009. OnStage Magazine has been operated by the Drama Department since 2016. The Mockingbird, a student-run and student-funded publication, began printing in 2020. Since 2011, the Phi Beta Kappa liberal arts honor society has published the University Scholar once a semester to showcase essays, short stories, poems, and scientific abstracts of the university's undergraduates.

=== Tuition ===
For an on-campus student, the cost of attendance for the 2019–2020 school year was $59,600. For an off-campus resident in Texas, the cost of attendance for the 2019–2020 school year was $55,640. For a student living with parents or relatives, the cost of attendance for the 2019–2020 school year was $51,340.

== Arts ==
=== Drama ===
Patrick and Judy Kelly built up the UD drama program beginning in 1972. The first productions were in a former cafeteria, which after adaptations was named the Margaret Jonsson Theater. As part of the opening festivities in November of 1972, actor Charles Siebert held a speech. Patrick Kelly directed 60 productions in over 40 years at the university. Students Peter MacNichol and Christopher Evan Welch went on to successful acting careers. Patrick Kelly retired in 2009, but later directed Pinter's The Birthday Party at Dallas's Undermain Theatre.

== Athletics ==
The Dallas Crusaders represent the University of Dallas in intercollegiate athletics. The Crusaders compete in NCAA Division III and are members of the Southern Collegiate Athletic Conference.

== Notable people ==
=== Alumni ===
==== Intellectuals, artists and entertainers ====
- Larry Arnhart – political theorist
- Jeffrey Bishop – philosopher, physician and bioethicist
- L. Brent Bozell III – political commentator
- L. M. Kit Carson – actor and screenwriter
- Elizabeth (Betsy) DiSalvo – computer scientist
- John C. Eastman – legal scholar
- Joe G. N. Garcia – medical researcher and academic administrator
- Henry Godinez – theater scholar
- Lara Grice – actress
- Ernie Hawkins – guitarist and singer
- Jason Henderson – novelist and comic book author
- Thomas S. Hibbs – philosopher
- Andy Hummel – bassist and songwriter
- Emily Jacir – artist and activist
- Anita Jose – business strategist, essayist
- Joseph Kelly – literary scholar
- Peter MacNicol – actor
- Patrick Madrid – author and radio host
- Taylor Marshall – writer and philosophy professor
- William Marshner – ethicist and theologian
- John McCaa – television journalist
- Eric McLuhan – media theorist
- Trish Murphy – singer-songwriter
- Carl Olson – journalist
- Mackubin Thomas Owens – university administrator
- Margot Roosevelt – journalist
- Gary Schmitt – co-founder of the Project for the New American Century
- Daryush Shokof – artist, filmmaker, and philosopher
- Christopher Evan Welch – actor
- Gene Wolande – actor
- Brantly Womack – professor of government and foreign affairs

==== Business, politics and public affairs ====
- Miriem Bensalah-Chaqroun – businesswoman
- Robert Bunda – politician
- Emmet Flood – government official
- John H. Gibson – government official and business executive
- Tadashi Inuzuka – politician and diplomat
- Katherine, Crown Princess of Yugoslavia – wife of Alexander, Crown Prince of Yugoslavia
- Michael Neeb – businessman
- Rosemary Odinga – entrepreneur and activist
- Tan Parker – politician and businessman
- Susan Orr Traffas – government official
- Mutryce Williams – Kittian ambassador to the United Nations

==== Religious leaders ====
- Oscar Cantú – bishop of San Jose
- Michael Duca – bishop of Baton Rouge
- Daniel E. Flores – bishop of Brownsville
- David Konderla – bishop of Tulsa
- Shawn McKnight – bishop of Jefferson City
- Mark J. Seitz – bishop of El Paso

==== Athletes ====
- Mike McPhee – hockey player
- Tom Rafferty – football player

=== Faculty ===
The university's full-time, permanent faculty have included the following scholars:

- Mel Bradford – literary scholar and political theorist
- John Alexander Carroll – historian
- Louise Cowan – literary critic
- Eugene Curtsinger – novelist and academic administrator
- Chad Engelland – philosopher
- Willmoore Kendall – political theorist
- Thomas Lindsay – political theorist
- Wilfred M. McClay – historian
- Mary McClung - costume design and puppetry
- Joshua Parens – philosopher
- Philipp Rosemann – philosopher
- Robert Skeris – theologian and musicologist
- Janet E. Smith – classicist and philosopher
- Gerard Wegemer – literary scholar
- Scott Churchill – phenomenological psychologist
- Thomas G. West – political theorist
- Frederick Wilhelmsen – philosopher
