= Cistercian Studies =

Book series

- Country: United States
- Language: English
- Discipline: Christianity
- Publisher: Liturgical Press (formerly Cistercian Publications), Saint John's Abbey, Collegeville
- Published: 1968
- No. of books: Approx. 300
- Website: Web page

Cistercian Studies (abbreviated CS; ISSN 0578-3224) is a series of books published by Liturgical Press (formerly Cistercian Publications). The main focus of the series is on Christian monasticism, Christian mysticism, patristics, the history of Christianity, and other related topics.

== List of volumes ==
List of volumes in the series:

No.	Title	Author
1	Contemplative Prayer	Thomas Merton
2	The monastic theology of Aelred of Rievaulx: an experiential theology	Amédée Hallier
3	Cistercian Spirit: Symposium	M. Basil Pennington
4	Evagrius Ponticus: The Praktikos & Chapters on Prayer	John Eudes Bamberger
5	Community and Abbot in the Rule of St. Benedict (2 Volumes)	Adalbert de Vogüé
6	The Rule of the Master	Luke Eberle
7	Aspects of monasticism	Jean Leclercq
8	The eleventh-century background of Cîteaux	Bede K. Lackner
9	Thomas Merton on St. Bernard	Thomas Merton
10	William of St Thierry: The Man and His Work	Jean Déchanet
11	The Cistercian sign language: a study in non-verbal communication	Robert A. Barakat
12	Rule and life: an interdisciplinary symposium	M. Basil Pennington
13	Studies in Mediaeval Cistercian History: Presented to Jeremiah F. O'Sullivan	Jeremiah Francis O'Sullivan
14	The abbot in monastic tradition: a contribution to the history of the perpetual character of the office of religious superiors in the West	Pierre Salmon
15	The Golden Chain: A Study in the Theological Anthropology of Isaac of Stella	Bernard McGinn
16	Bernard of Clairvaux and the Cistercian Spirit	Jean Leclercq
17	Why monks?	François Vandenbroucke
18	Merton's Theology of Prayer	John J. Higgins
19	Contemplative Life	Jean Leclercq
20	Consider Your Call: Theology of Monastic Life Today	Daniel Rees
21	Contemplative Community: An Interdisciplinary Symposium	M. Basil Pennington
22	Silence: The Meaning of Silence in the Rule of St. Benedict	Ambrose G Wathen
23	Bernard of Clairvaux: Studies Presented to Dom Jean Leclercq	Jean Leclercq
24	Studies in medieval Cistercian history. II [papers]	John R. Sommerfeldt
25	Christ the way: the Christology of Guerric of Igny	John Morson
26	Russian Mystics	Sergius Bolshakoff
27	Thomas Merton: the man and his work	Dennis Q. McInerny
28	Saint Bernard of Clairvaux: studies commemorating the eighth centenary of his canonization	M. Basil Pennington
29	One yet two: monastic tradition, East and West: Orthodox-Cistercian Symposium, Oxford University, 26 August-1 September, 1973	M. Basil Pennington
30	The Spirituality of Western Christendom	E. Rozanne Elder
33	Dorotheos of Gaza: Discourses and Sayings	Dorotheos of Gaza
34	The Lives of the Desert Fathers: Historia Monachorum in Aegypto	Norman Russell
35	The Cistercians in Denmark: their attitudes, roles, and functions in medieval society	Brian Patrick McGuire
36	The Monastic Rule of Iosif Volotsky	David M. Goldfrank
37	Studies in monastic theology	Odo Brooke
38	Abba: guides to wholeness and holiness, East and West: papers presented at a Symposium on Spiritual Fatherhood/Motherhood at the Abbey of New Clairvaux, Vina, California, 12-16 June, 1978	John R. Sommerfeldt
39	Households of God: Rule of St. Benedict, with Explanations for Monks and Lay-people Today	David Parry
40	Solitude in the thought of Thomas Merton	Richard Anthony Cashen
41	The practical and theological chapters; and, Three theological discourses	Symeon the New Theologian
42	The Message of Thomas Merton	Patrick Hart
43	Entirely for God: the life of Michael Iwene Tansi	Elizabeth Allo Isichei
44	The Name of Jesus	Irénée Hausherr
45	The Life of Saint Pachomius and His Disciples: Volume 1	Armand Veilleux
46	Pachomian Chronicles and Rules	Armand Veilleux
47	Instructions, Letters and Other Writings of Saint Pachomius and His Disciples	Armand Veilleux
48	Ladder of Monks and Twelve Meditations	Guigo II
49	The Way to God According to the Rule of St. Benedict	Emmanuel Heufelder
50	Aelred of Rievaulx: A Study	Aelred Squire
51	In quest of the absolute: the life and work of Jules Monchanin	Jules Monchanin
52	Thomas Merton, Monk a Monastic Tribute	Patrick Hart
53	Penthos: The Doctrine of Compunction in the Christian East	Irénée Hausherr
55	The Roots of the Modern Christian Tradition [The Spirituality of Western Christendom II]	E. Rozanne Elder
56	The Occupation of Celtic Sites in Medieval Ireland by the Canons Regular of St. Augustine and the Cistercians	Geraldine Carville
57	Nicolas Cotheret's Annals of Citeaux, Outlined from the Original French	Louis Julius Lekai
58	Sermons in a Monastery: Chapter Talks	Matthew Kelty
59	The Sayings of the Desert Fathers	Benedicta Ward
60	Cistercian ideals and reality	John R. Sommerfeldt
61	Simplicity and ordinariness	John R. Sommerfeldt
62	Thomas Merton's Shared Contemplation: A Protestant Perspective	Daniel J. Adams
63	The chimaera of his age: studies on Bernard of Clairvaux	E. Rozanne Elder
64	Cistercians in the Late Middle Ages	E. Rozanne Elder
65	Noble piety and reformed monasticism	E. Rozanne Elder
66	Studies in Cistercian Art and Architecture: Volume 1	Meredith P. Lillich
67	Benedictus, studies in honor of St Benedict of Nursia	E. Rozanne Elder
68	Heaven on Earth (studies in Medieval Cistercian History, IX)	E. Rozanne Elder
69	Studies in Cistercian Art and Architecture: Volume 2	Meredith Parsons Lillich
70	As We Seek God: International Reflections on Contemporary Benedictine Monasticism: Internati	Stephanie Campbell
71	Medieval Religious Women: Distant Echoes	John A. Nichols
72	Medieval Religious Women: Peace Weavers	John A. Nichols
73	The Life of Shenoute	Besa
74	Thomas Merton and Asia: his quest for utopia	Alexander Lipski
75	Monastic practices	Charles Cummings
76	The Cistercian Way	André Louf
77	A thirst for God: Spiritual Desire in Bernard of Clairvaux's Sermons on the Song of Songs	Michael Casey
78	The image and likeness: the Augustinian spirituality of William of St Thierry	David N. Bell
79	The Spirituality of the Christian East, Vol. 1: A Systematic Handbook	Tomas Spidlik
80	The Letters of Armand-Jean de Rancé, Abbot and Reformer of La Trappe, Volume 1	Armand Jean Le Bouthillier De Rance
81	The Letters of Armand-Jean de Rancé, Abbot and Reformer of La Trappe, Volume 2	Armand Jean Le Bouthillier De Rance
82	Bede the Venerable: Commentary on the Seven Catholic Epistles	Venerable Bede
83	Serving God First: Insights on the Rule of St. Benedict	Sighard Kleiner
84	Goad and nail	E. Rozanne Elder
85	Finances of the Cistercian Order in the Fourteenth Century	Peter King
86	Rancé and the Trappist Legacy	A. J. Krailsheimer
87	Saint Hugh of Lincoln	David Hugh Farmer
88	History of the Monks of Syria	Theodoret of Cyrrhus
89	Studies in Cistercian Art and Architecture: Volume 3	Meredith Parsons Lillich
90	From Cloister to Classroom Monastic and Scholastic Approaches to Truth: The Spirituality of Western Christendom III	E. Rozanne Elder
91	Fountains Abbey and Its Benefactors, 1132-1300	Joan Wardrop
92	The Legacy of Thomas Merton	Patrick Hart
93	Fathers talking: an anthology	Aelred Squire
94	William, Abbot of Saint Thierry: A Colloquium at the Abbey of Saint Thierry	Jerry Carfantan
95	Friendship & community: the monastic experience, 350-1250	Brian Patrick McGuire
96	The Letters of Saint Anselm of Canterbury, volume 1	Anselm of Canterbury
97	The Letters of Saint Anselm of Canterbury, volume 2	Anselm of Canterbury
98	Erudition at God's Service: Studies in Medieval Cistercian History, XI (v. 11)	John R. Sommerfeldt
99	St. Benedict's Rule for Monks: Selected Passages from the Rule of St. Benedict	Abbot of Monte Cassino Saint Benedict
100	Selected Works	Peter of Celle
101	The Syriac Fathers on Prayer and the Spiritual Life	Sebastian Brock
102	Thomas Merton: Monk and Artist	Victor A. Kramer
103	Toward an Integrated Humanity: Thomas Merton's Journey	M. Basil Pennington
104	Women and Saint Bernard of Clairvaux	Jean Leclercq
105	A Second Look at Bernard of Clairvaux	Jean Leclercq
106	Harlots of the Desert: A Study of Repentance in Early Monastic Sources	Benedicta Ward
107	The life of Isaac of Alexandria & the martyrdom of Saint Macrobius	Mēna of Nikiou
108	The Life of Saint Mary Magdalene and of Her Sister Saint Martha	Rabanus Maurus
109	A Cloud of Witnesses: An Introductory History of the Development of Christian Doctrine	David N. Bell
110	Homilies on the Gospels: Advent to Lent (Book 1)	Venerable Bede
111	Homilies on the Gospels: Lent to the Dedication of the Church (Book 2)	Venerable Bede
112	The Lives of Simeon Stylites	Robert Doran
113	Hidden Springs: Cistercian Monastic Women	John A. Nichols
113B	Hidden Springs: Cistercian Monastic Women (Vol 3: Book 2 of 2)	John A. Nichols
114	The Lives of the Monks of Palestine	Cyril of Scythopolis
115	In the Unity of the Holy Spirit: Spiritual Talks on the Rule of Saint Benedict	Sighard Kleiner
116	Spiritual Direction in the Early Christian East	Irénée Hausherr
117	The Venerable Bede Commentary on the Acts of the Apostles	Venerable Bede
118	The hermit monks of Grandmont	Carole A. Hutchison
119	A Silent Herald of Unity: The Life of Maria Gabriella Sagheddu	Martha Driscoll
120	The mystical theology of Saint Bernard	Étienne Gilson
121	Beatrice of Nazareth in her Context	Roger De Ganck
122	Towards Unification with God (Beatrice of Nazareth in her Context, Part Three)	Roger De Ganck
123	Forty Gospel Homilies	Pope Gregory I
124	The Luminous Eye: The Spiritual World Vision of Saint Ephrem	Sebastian Brock
125	The spiritual teachings of Bernard of Clairvaux: an intellectual history of the early Cistercian Order	John R. Sommerfeldt
126	The Difficult Saint: Bernard of Clairvaux and His Tradition	Brian Patrick McGuire
127	Love Without Measure: Extracts from the Writings of Saint Bernard of Clairvaux	Bernard of Clairvaux
128	Wholly Animals: A Book of Beastly Tales	David N. Bell
129	Tuning in to Grace: The Quest for God	André Louf
130	An index of authors and works in Cistercian libraries in Great Britain	David N. Bell
131	The Cistercians in Scandinavia	James France
132	An Index of Cistercian Authors and Works in Medieval Library Catalogues in Great Britain	David N. Bell
133	The Monastic Journey	Thomas Merton
134	Studies in Cistercian Art and Architecture: Volume 4	Meredith Lillich
135	Bernardus Magister: Papers Presented at the Nonacentenary Celebration of the Birth of Saint Bernard of Clairvaux, Kalamazoo, Michigan	John R. Sommerfeldt
136	The Call of Wild Geese	Matthew Kelty
137	They Speak by Silences	A Carthusian
138	The Rule of Saint Augustine	Saint Augustine
139	The Spiritual Meadow	John Moschus
140	Histories of the Monks of Upper Egypt and the Life of Onnophrius: And, the Life of Onnophrius	Paphnutius the Ascetic
141	Studiosorum speculum: studies in honor of Louis J. Lekai, O. Cist.	Louis Julius Lekai
142	The Letters of Saint Anselm of Canterbury, volume 3	Anselm of Canterbury
143	Handmaids of the Lord: contemporary descriptions of feminine asceticism in the first six Christian centuries	Joan M. Petersen
144	With Greater Liberty: A Short History of Christian Monasticism and Religious Orders	Karl Suso Frank
145	Spirituality of the Medieval West: The Eighth to the Twelfth Century	André Vauchez
146	Many Mansions: An Introduction to the Development & Diversity of Medieval Theology	David N. Bell
147	The Contemplative Path: Reflections on Recovering a Lost Tradition	E. Rozanne Elder
148	Drinking from the Hidden Fountain: A Patristic Breviary: Ancient Wisdom for Today's World	Tomas Spidlik
149	Way of Silent Love	A Carthusian
150	Abba Isaiah of Scetis: ascetic discourses	Isaiah of Scetis
151	Reading Saint Benedict: Reflections on the Rule	Adalbert de Vogüé
152	Stones Laid before the Lord: A History of Monastic Architecture	Anselme Dimier
153	No Moment Too Small: Rhythms of Silence, Prayer, and Holy Reading	Norvene Vest
155	The Meditations of Guigo I, Prior of the Charterhouse	Prior of the Grande Chartreuse Guigo
156	Eros and Allegory: Medieval Exegesis of the Song of Songs	Denys Turner
157	The Wound of Love	A Carthusian
158	What Nuns Read: Books and Libraries in Medieval English Nunneries	David N. Bell
159	The Spiritually Beneficial Tales of Paul, Bishop of Monembasia: And of Other Authors	Bishop of Monemvasia Paul
160	The joy of learning and the love of God: studies in honor of Jean Leclercq	Jean Leclercq
161	A gathering of friends: the learning and spirituality of John of Forde	Hilary Costello
162	The Celtic Monk: Rules & Writings of Early Irish Monks	Uinseann Ó Maidín
163	The Call of Silent Love	A Carthusian
164	Interior Prayer	A Carthusian
165	Achard of St Victor: Works	Achard of Saint-Victor
166	Where Silence Is Praise	A Carthusian
167	Studies in Cistercian Art and Architecture: Volume 5	Meredith Lillich
168	Pater Bernhardus: Martin Luther and Bernard of Clairvaux	Franz Posset
169	The Venerable Bede	Benedicta Ward
170	The Cistercians in Medieval Art	James France
171	A Monastic Odyssey	Marie de la Trinité Kervingant
172	The Freedom of Obedience: Carthusian Novice Conferences	A Carthusian
173	The Prayer of Love and Silence	A Carthusian
174	Mercy in Weakness: Meditations on the Word	André Louf
175	The Spiritual World of Isaac the Syrian	Hilarion Alfeyev
176	The Three Founders of Citeaux	Jean-Baptiste van Damme
177	Stephen of Muret: Maxims	Stephen of Muret
178	The Life of the Jura Fathers: The Life and Rule of the Holy Fathers Romanus, Lupicinus, and Eugendus, Abbots of the Monasteries in the Jura Mountains	Tim Vivian
179	The Cistercian Abbeys of Britain	David M. Robinson
180	The hermitage within: spirituality of the desert	Alan Neame
181	High King of Heaven: Aspects of Early English Spirituality	Benedicta Ward
182	Praying the Word: An Introduction to Lectio Divina	Enzo Bianchi
183	Venerable Bede: Excerpts, Augustine, Paul	The Venerable Bede
184	Poor, Therefore Rich: Carthusian Novice Conferences	Carthusian
185	Western Monasticism: A History of the Monastic Movement in the Latin Church	Peter King
186	Halfway to Heaven: The Hidden Life of the Sublime Carthusians	Robin Bruce Lockhart
187	Pathway of Peace: Cistercian Wisdom According to Saint Bernard	Charles Dumont
188	From Advent to Pentecost: Carthusian Novice Conferences	A Carthusian
189	A Life Pleasing to God: The Spirituality of the Rules of St Basil	Augustine Holmes
190	Praying with Benedict: Prayer in the Rule of St. Benedict	Korneel Vermeiren
191	Cistercian Europe: architecture of contemplation	Terryl N. Kinder
192	Manjava Skete: Ukrainian Monastic Writings of the Seventeenth Century	Sophia Senyk
193	Praise No Less Than Charity: Studies in Honor of M. Chrysogonus Waddell, Monk of Gethsemani Abbey	E. Rozanne Elder
194	Studies in Cistercian Art and Architecture: Volume 6	Meredith Parsons Lillich
195	Grace Can Do More: Spiritual Accompaniment and Spiritual Growth	André Louf
196	The Book of Steps: The Syriac Liber Graduum	Robert A. Kitchen
197	How Far to Follow?: The Martyrs of Atlas	Bernardo Olivera
198	Ss. Vincenzo e Anastasio at Tre Fontane near Rome: history and architecture of a medieval Cistercian abbey	Joan Barclay Lloyd
199	The search for God: conferences, letters, and homilies	Bernardo Olivera
200	Grimlaicus: Rule for Solitaries	Grimlaicus
201	Bearers of the Spirit: Spiritual Fatherhood in the Romanian Orthodox Tradition	Nicolas Stebbing
202	Against the Heathen	Athanasius
204	Truth as gift: studies in medieval Cistercian history in honor of John R. Sommerfeldt	Marsha L. Dutton
205	Understanding Rancé: The Spirituality of the Abbot of La Trappe in Context	David N. Bell
206	The Spirituality of the Christian East, Vol. 2: Prayer	Tomas Spidlik
207	Words to Live by: Journeys in Ancient And Modern Egyptian Monasticism (Colección Semillas)	Tim Vivian
208	Stewards of the Poor: The Man of God, Rabbula, and Hiba in Fifth-century Edessa	Robert Doran
209	Saint Mary of Egypt: Three Medieval Lives in Verse	Ronald Pepin
210	Medieval images of Saint Bernard of Clairvaux: illustrations	James France
211	Peter Abelard after marriage: the spiritual direction of Heloise and her nuns through liturgical song	Thomas J. Bell
212	Commentary on the Rule of Saint Benedict	Smaragdus of Saint-Mihiel
213	Christ Within Me: Prayers and Meditations from the Anglo-Saxon Tradition	Benedicta Ward
214	Kurisumala: Francis Mahieu Acharya, a pioneer of Christian monasticism in India	Marthe Mahieu-De Praetere
215	The Blessing of Blessings: Grigor of Narek's Commentary on the Song of Songs	Gregory of Narek (Grigor Narekatsi)
216	The Wisdom of the Pearlers: An Anthology of Syriac Christian Mysticism	Brian Colless
217	Rooted in detachment: living the Transfiguration	Kenneth Stevenson
218	A Cloud of Witnesses: An Introductory History of the Development of Christian Doctrine to 500 AD	David N. Bell
219	Witness to Holiness: Abba Daniel of Scetis	Tim Vivian
220	Benedict of Aniane: The Emperor's Monk	Allen Cabaniss
221	Nil Sorsky: The Authentic Writings	David Goldfrank
222	Lives of monastic reformers, 1: Robert of La Chaise-Dieu and Stephen of Obazine	Ronald E. Pepin
223	The Life and Miracles of Saint Maurus	Odo
224	Useful Servanthood: A Study of Spiritual Formation in the Writings of Abba Ammonas	Bernadette McNary-Zak
225	Becoming Fire: Through the Year with the Desert Fathers and Mothers	Tim Vivian
226	Stephen Harding: A Biographical Sketch and Texts	Claudio Stercal
227	A Light to Enlighten the Darkness: Daily Readings for Meditation During the Winter Season	Emma Cazabonne
228	Orthodoxy: Evolving Tradition	David N. Bell
229	Talking Back: A Monastic Handbook for Combating Demons	Evagrius of Pontus
230	The Lives of Monastic Reformers 2: Abbot Vitalis of Savigny, Abbot Godfrey of Savigny, Peter of Avranches, and Blessed Hamo	Hugh Feiss
231	Reading to Live: The Evolving Practice of Lectio Divina	Raymond Studzinski
232	Anselm of Havelberg, Anticimenon: on the unity of the faith and the controversies with the Greeks	Bishop of Havelberg Anselm
233	In the Valley of Wormwood: Cistercian Blessed and Saints of the Golden Age	Thomas Merton
234	The Holy Workshop of Virtue: The Life of John the Little by Zacharias of Sakha	Tim Vivian
235	The Discourses of Philoxenos of Mabbug: A New Translation and Introduction	Robert A. Kitchen
236	Outreach and renewal: a first-millennium legacy for the third-millennium church	James McSherry
238	Lectio Divina: The Medieval Experience of Reading	Duncan Robertson
239	Following the Footsteps of the Invisible: The Complete Works of Diadochus of Photike	Cliff Ermatinger
240	The Book of the Elders: Sayings of the Desert Fathers: The Systematic Collection	John Wortley
241	Hildegard of Bingen: Homilies on the Gospels	Hildegard of Bingen
242	Spirituality of the Premonstratensians: the twelfth and thirteenth centuries	Francois Petit
243	The Maronites: The Origins of an Antiochene Church	Paul Naaman
244	On the Song of Songs	Pope Gregory I
245	The crown of monks	Smaragdus of Saint-Mihiel
246	Separate but Equal: Cistercian Lay Brothers 1120-1300	James France
247	Christian De Cherge: A Theology of Hope	Christian Salenson
248	Bernard of Clairvaux, theologian of the cross	Anthony N.S. Lane
249	Moral Reflections on the Book of Job, Volume 1	Gregory the Great
250	Mystagogy: A Monastic Reading of Dionysius Areopagita	Alexander Golitzin
251	Aelred the Peacemaker: The Public Life of a Cistercian Abbot	Jean Truax
252	Palladius of Aspuna: The Lausiac History	Palladius of Aspuna
253	Hildegard of Bingen: Solutions to Thirty-Eight Questions	Saint Hildegard
254	Can a seamless garment be truly torn? Questions surrounding the Jewish-Catholic Löb family, 1881-1945	Peter Steffen
255	Reclaiming Humility: Four Studies in the Monastic Tradition	Jane Foulcher
256	The Rule of Benedict: An Invitation to the Christian Life	Georg Holzherr
257	Moral Reflections on the Book of Job, Volume 2	Gregory the Great
258	Moral Reflections on the Book of Job, Volume 3	Gregory the Great
259	Moral Reflections on the Book of Job, Volume 4	Gregory the Great
260	Moral Reflections on the Book of Job, Volume 5	Gregory the Great
263	The World of Medieval Monasticism: Its History and Forms of Life	Gert Melville
264	The Old English Rule of Saint Benedict: with Related Old English Texts	Æthelwold
265	In the School of Prophets: The Formation of Thomas Merton's Prophetic Spirituality	Ephrem Arcement
266	Thomas Merton: Early Essays, 1947-1952	Patrick F. O'Connell
267	The Life of Jesus Christ: Part One, Volume 1, Chapters 1–40	Ludolph of Saxony
268	Unity of spirit: studies on William of Saint-Thierry in honor of E. Rozanne Elder	F. Tyler Sergent
269	A Not-So-Unexciting Life: Essays on Benedictine History and Spirituality in Honor of Michael Casey, OCSO	Carmel Posa SGS
270	Saint Columban: his life, rule, and legacy	Terrence G. Kardong
271	A Saint in the Sun: Praising Saint Bernard in the France of Louis XIV	David N. Bell
272	The Text of a Coptic Monastic Discourse On Love and Self-Control: Its Story from the Fourth Century to the Twenty-First	Carolyn Schneider
274	Everyday Life at La Trappe under Armand-Jean de Rancé	David N. Bell
275	A Benedictine reader: 530-1530	Hugh Feiss
282	The Life of Jesus Christ: Part One, Volume 2, Chapters 41-70	Ludolph of Saxony
289	Thousands and Thousands of Lovers: Sense of Community among the Nuns of Helfta	Anna Harrison

== See also ==
- Popular Patristics Series
