= Eight Verses of Bernard of Clairvaux =

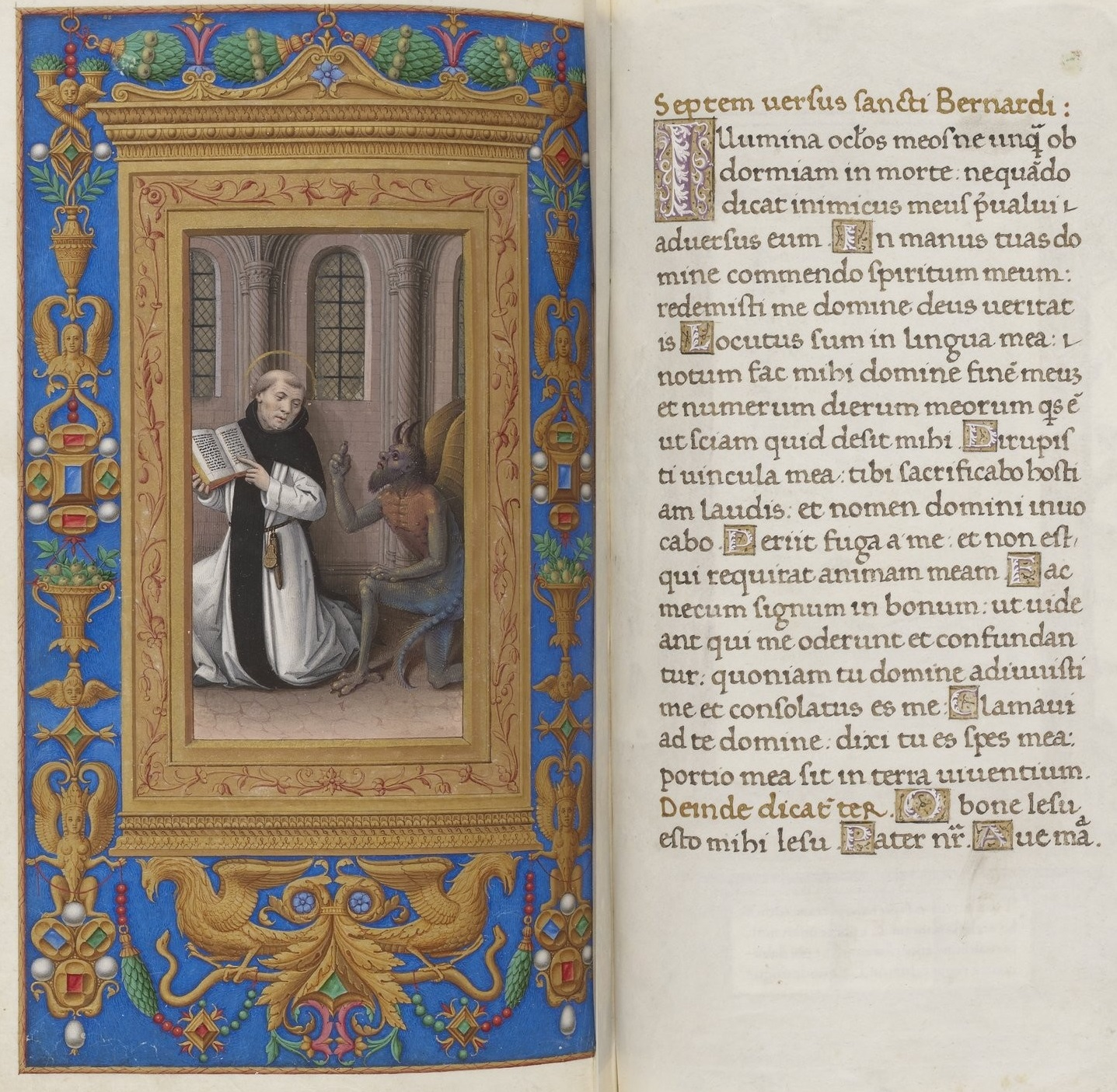
Book of hours of Frederick of Aragon (1501): St. Bernard and the devil, opposite page shows the psalm verses (here only seven)

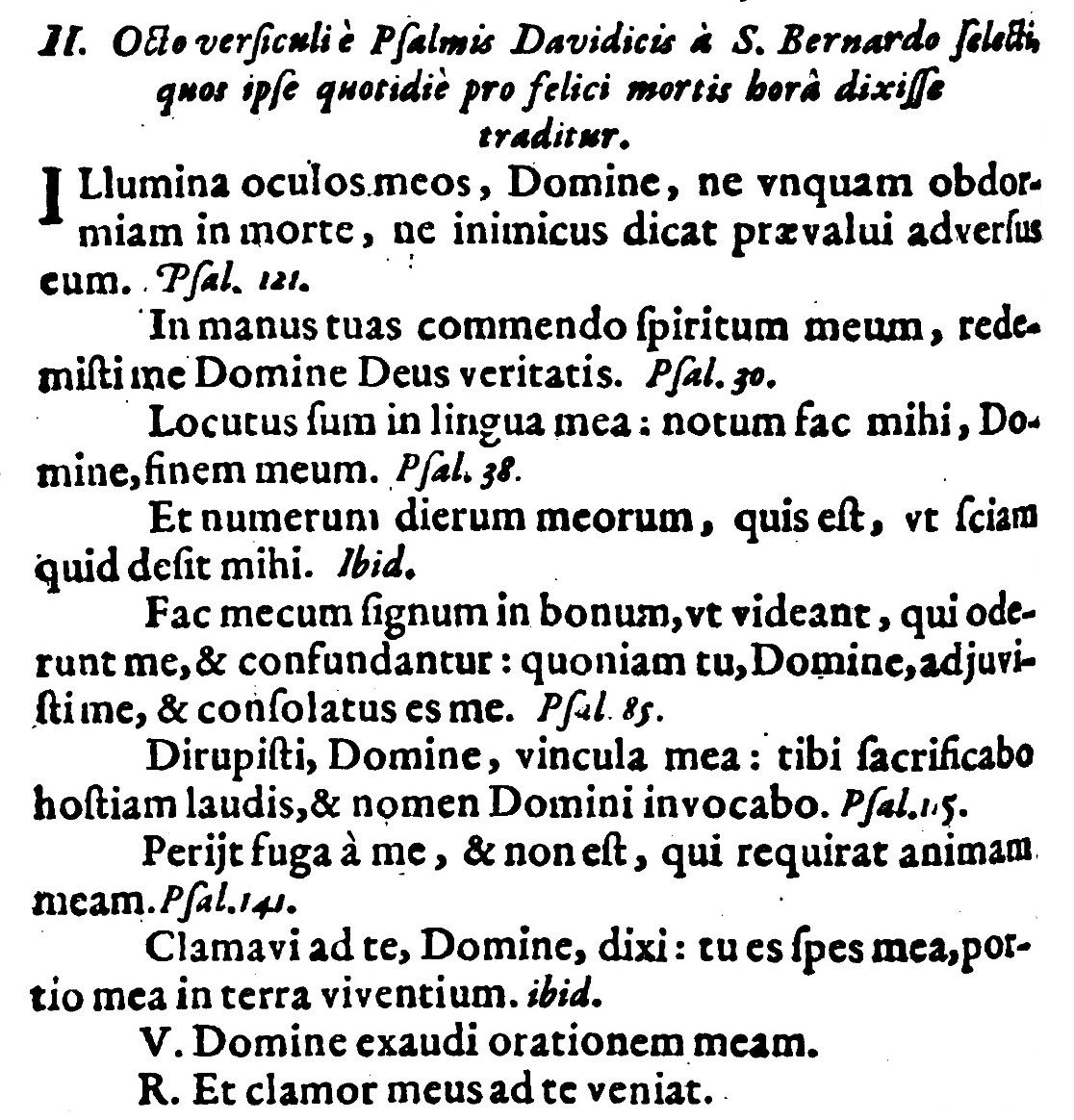
Eight verses from David's psalms, selected by St. Bernard, which he is said to have prayed daily for a good death, in: David Gregor Corner: Promptuarium catholic devotions, fifth ed., Vienna 1636

The Eight Verses of St. Bernard are excerpts from psalms which, when recited, were said to have saved souls and guaranteed a holy death. Popular in the Late Middle Ages, the origins of the devotion and details are unknown. Legends attribute the selection and propagation of the devotion to Bernard of Clairvaux.

== Cultural context ==
Books of Hours from the 15th century often feature additional prayers listed after the Psalter. A humorous legend, included in some of the books, explained the selection of psalms attributed to Bernard. The devil is said to have told Bernard that he knew of eight (some sources say seven) psalm verses that would ensure salvation if recited daily. The devil did not reveal which verses. Bernard countered by saying that he did not need to know which verses to say, since he recited the entire Psalter daily as a matter of course. Feeling defeated by the saint's argument, the devil gave up and told the Cistercian abbot which verses to recite. These eight were included in a vast amount of prayer books and were widely copied in Late Medieval Europe.

The verses come from the Vulgata. The following section provides the English translation from the Douay Rheims Bible:

- Enlighten my eyes that I never sleep in death. (Ps 12)
- Into thy hands I commend my spirit: thou hast redeemed me, O Lord, the God of truth. (Ps 30)
- I spoke with my tongue : O Lord, make me know my end. And what is the number of my days : that I may know what is wanting to me. (Ps 38,4b–5 often split and counted twice).
- Shew me a token for good: that they who hate me may see, and be confounded, because thou, O Lord, hast helped me and hast comforted me. (Ps 85)
- Thou hast broken my bonds: I will sacrifice to thee the sacrifice of praise, and I will call upon the name of the Lord. (Ps 115)
- Flight hath failed me: and there is no one that hath regard to my soul. 6.I cried to thee, O Lord: I said: Thou art my hope, my portion in the land of the living. (Ps 141,5b-6 – often split and counted twice).

Comparable forms of late medieval piety are the Fifteen Joys of Mary and the 30 Gregorian Masses.

== Sources ==
- James France: The Heritage of Saint Bernard in Medieval Art. In: Brian Patrick McGuire (Hrsg.): A Companion to Bernard of Clairvaux. Leiden 2011, pp. 305–346, here 337–338 (with illustration of the dialogue between saint and demon).
