= Jean-Marie Déchanet =

Priest and monk

Fr. Jean-Marie Déchanet OSB
- Born: Gabriel-Robert-Vladimir Déchanet; 18 January 1906; Isches, France
- Died: 19 May 1992 (aged 86); Bruges, Belgium

Jean-Marie Déchanet (18 January 1906 – 19 May 1992) was a French monk of the Benedictine order. Erudite and a great connoisseur of William of Saint-Thierry, in the 1950s he became the first to open the Christian world to the practice of yoga and became known as the "father of Christian yoga".

== Biography ==
Jean-Marie Déchanet was born on 18 January 1906 in Isches, in the Vosges. He lost his father (Octave Déchanet) at the age of two and was raised by his mother Marie-Rose Braconnier, with his grandparents, in the Verdun region.

In 1924, at the age of 18, he entered the novice at the abbaye Saint-André near Bruges, Belgium, and made his religious profession in 1927. However, suffering from epilepsy, he was not ordained a priest. From 1939 to 1958, he wrote a series of articles and several books on cistercian mysticism of the 12th century, on William of Saint Thierry (friend of saint Bernard) of which he became the great specialist. In the early 1940s, he took part in a number of physical exercises which, it seems, cured his epilepsy. He was ordained a priest on 22 May 1948.

Among these exercises Déchanet discovers Hatha yoga. It was a turning point in his life. From then on, practicing yoga and reflecting on the contribution of this Eastern practice to the Christian meditation and contemplative life, he wrote The Way of Silence (Yoga for Christians) and soon the Christian Yoga in Ten Lessons (1956). Before Vatican II, he was the first to explicitly encourage Christians to practice yoga. He is therefore known as the "Father of Christian Yoga". During these years he corresponded with Thomas Merton.

From 1957 to 1964 Déchanet was in Katanga (Congo). The diocese of Lubumbashi was entrusted to the Benedictines of Abbaye Saint-André de Bruges and he helped found the Benedictine monastery of Kansenia, where he was successively master of novices and postulants and superior of the community. His attempts to africanize European monastic culture met with opposition from the ecclesiastical authorities. He decided to return to Europe.

With the agreement of his abbey, he moved to a hermitage in Valjouffrey, a hamlet in the Alps, in the Isère. There he devoted himself entirely to the practice of yoga, while studying and reflecting on how to integrate this spiritual discipline of Hindu origin into the Christian contemplative life. From 1970 onwards, Déchanet received visitors, students and disciples who followed his yoga courses, practical exercises and theology teaching. He also wrote extensively on the subject.

After 24 years at Valjouffrey, Déchanet returned to his abbey near Bruges in autumn 1990 at the age of 84. He died there on 19 May 1992.

== Writings ==
=== About Guillaume de Saint-Thiery ===
- Méditations et prières... (by Guillaume de Saint-Thierry) translation by Déchanet), Bruxelles, Éd. universitaires, 1945, 244pp.
- "Exposé sur le Cantique des Cantiques" (by Guillaume de Saint-Thierry), Sources chrétiennes no. 82 (1962)
- Letter to the brothers of Mont-Dieu [Lettre d'or] (by Guillaume de Saint-Thierry), Sources chrétiennes no. 223 (1975)
- le Miroir de la Foi" (by Guillaume de Saint-Thierry), Sources chrétiennes no. 301 (1983)
- Guillaume de Saint-Thierry, aux sources d'une pensée", Paris, Éditions Beauchesne, 1978, 150 pp.

=== About 'Yoga and the Christian life' ===
- La voie du silence (yoga pour chrétien), Paris, DDB, 1959. 232pp.
- Yoga chrétien en dix leçons", Paris, DDB, 1964.
- Journal d'un yogi, mon corps et moi, Paris, Le Courrier du livre, 1967.
- Journal d'un Yogi, mon cœur et Dieu, Paris, Le Courrier du livre, 1969
- Go where your heart leads you. Au-delà du yoga", Paris, DDB, 1972, 174pp.
- Eio, la vie", published by Cahiers du Val, issue no. 4, 1974
- Yes to life. Vivant et libre, Paris, DDB, 1975, 155pp.
- La Parabole de l'amour, votre corps, qu'annonce-t-il de votre âme?", Paris, DDB, 1976, 198pp.
- Itinéraire d'un rebelle", Paris, DDB, 1982.

== Bibliography ==
- Marie-Thérèse Maltèse: Jean Déchanet, l'ermite du Valjouffrey, Paris, Le Cerf, 1981.
