= Brian McGuire =

Brian McGuire may refer to:

- Brian McGuire Cashman, baseball executive
- Brian Patrick McGuire, historian
- Brian McGuire (racing driver) (1945–1977)
