= James France =

James France may refer to:

- James France (historian) (born 1930), businessman and historian of art and monasticism
- Jim France (born 1944), American motorsports executive
