= Medieval Institute =

Institute at Western Michigan University focusing on medieval studies

- Formation: 1962
- Type: Research institute
- Headquarters: Western Michigan University
- Location: Walwood Hall, Western Michigan University, Kalamazoo, Michigan, U.S.A.
- Key people: John R. Sommerfeldt (Founding Director)
- Website: wmich.edu/medieval

The Medieval Institute (also known as the Medieval Institute of Western Michigan University) is a research and teaching institute in the field of medieval studies associated with Western Michigan University in Kalamazoo, Michigan. The institute was founded in 1962 and offered the United States's first publicly awarded Master of Arts degree in medieval studies.

== Research activities ==
Presently, the institute organizes the International Congress on Medieval Studies (an annual academic conference held for scholars specializing in, or with an interest in, medieval studies).

The Institute also oversees the annual Otto Gründler Book Prize, the Loew Lectures in medieval studies, and the Richard Rawlinson Center. The Rawlinson Center is named for Richard Rawlinson and promotes the study of early medieval England and manuscripts.

=== Center for Cistercian and Monastic Studies ===
The Center for Cistercian and Monastic Studies was a research center under the Medieval Institute of Western Michigan University in Kalamazoo, Michigan, United States until 2023. The center was founded jointly by Western Michigan University and Cistercian Publications in 1973; in 2010 it was reformed as the Center for Cistercian and Monastic Studies. The center, which was supported by an Advisory Board, organized colloquia and published the Monastic Life series as part of the Medieval Institute Publications.

The Cistercian and Monastic Studies conference ran in conjunction with the International Congress on Medieval Studies until 2021, and focused on all aspects of monasticism from late antiquity to the present.

== Directors ==
- John R. Sommerfeldt - 1962-1976
- Otto Gründler - 1976-1995
- Paul E. Szarmach - 1995-2007
- James Murray - 2007-2015
- Jana K. Schulman - 2015-2022
- Robert F. Berkhofer - 2022-present

== Publications ==
Publications authored by the Medieval Institute are released through the Medieval Institute Publications university press imprint. This press, which was founded in 1978 and became a member of the Association of University Presses in 2011, specializes in "archeology, art history, dance, drama, history, literature, music, philosophy, and theology of the European Middle Ages and early modern period". The press currently operates in a partnership with the German academic publishing house De Gruyter.

=== Book series ===
Major book series released by Medieval Institute Publications include the following:

- "Christianities Before Modernity"
- "Early Drama, Art, and Music"
- "Festschriften, Occasional Papers, and Lectures"
- "Late Tudor and Stuart Drama: Gender, Performance, and Material Culture"
- "Ludic Cultures, 1100–1700"
- "Monastic Life"
- "Monsters, Prodigies, and Demons: Medieval and Early Modern Constructions of Alterity"
- "New Queer Medievalisms"
- "The Northern Medieval World"
- "Premodern Transgressive Literatures"
- "Research in Medieval and Early Modern Culture"
- "Publications of the Richard Rawlinson Center"
- "Studies in Iconography: Themes and Variations"
- "Studies in Medieval and Early Modern Culture"
- "Teaching Association for Medieval Studies (TEAMS) Commentary Series"
- "TEAMS Documents of Practice"
- "TEAMS German Texts in Bilingual Editions"
- "TEAMS Middle English Texts Series"
- "TEAMS Secular Commentary Series"
- "TEAMS Varia"

=== Journals ===
Journals published by the press include:

- Medieval Prosopography
- Studies in Iconography
- ROMARD
- Medieval Feminist Forum
