= Theodoric of Mont d'Hor =

French saint

Saint Thierry (Theodoric) of Mont d'Or
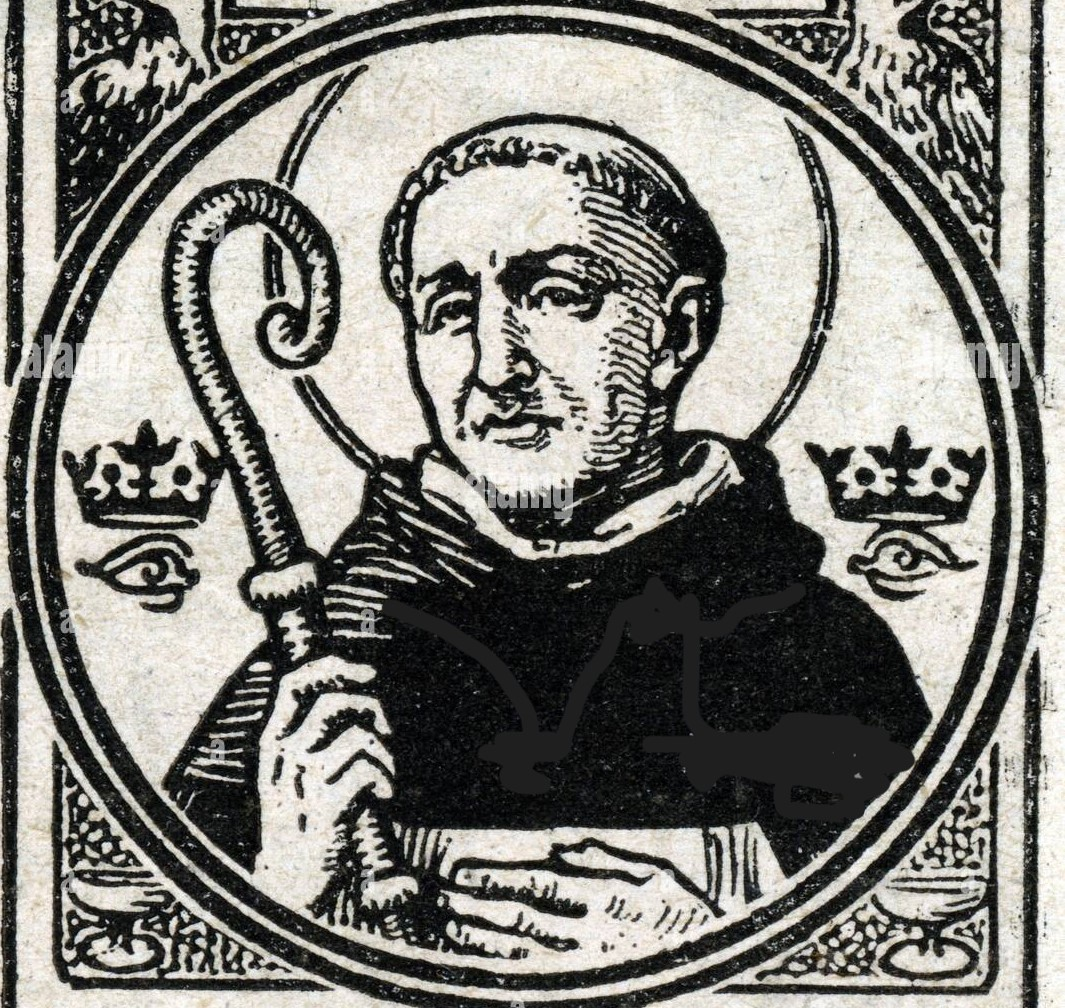
- Representation of Saint Thierry
- Born: March 9 France
- Died: July 1, 533; Reims, France
- Canonized: Pre-congregation
- Feast: July 1

Saint Thierry or Theodoric of Mont d'Hor (or Theudric, Thierri); born on March 9; died 533) was a disciple of Saint Remigius who became abbot of Saint-Thierry Abbey, near Reims, France. His feast day is 1 July.

== Monks of Ramsgate account ==
The monks of St Augustine's Abbey, Ramsgate wrote in their Book of Saints (1921):

Theodoric (St.) (July 1)
(6th cent.) A priest, disciple of St. Remigius of Rheims, famous for the miracles he wrought both in life and after death. He went to his rest A.D. 533.

== Butler's account ==
The hagiographer Alban Butler (1710–1773) wrote in his Lives of the Fathers, Martyrs, and Other Principal Saints under July 1:

St. Thierri, Abbot of Mont-d'Hor, near Rheims.

He was born in the district of Rheims. His father, Marquard, was abandoned to every infamous disorder. An education formed on the best Christian principles in the house of such a person would more than probable be blasted by his bad example; but our saint was happily removed, and educated in learning and piety, under the edifying example of the holy Bishop Remigius.

He married in complaisance to his relations; but easily persuaded his wife to embrace the virgin state; and becoming himself a monk, he was made superior of an abbey founded by St. Remigius on Mont-d’Hor, near Rheims. Some time after he received holy orders, and became famous by the many extraordinary conversions he wrought through the zeal and unction wherewith he exhorted sinners to repentance; among these was his own father, who persevered to his death under the direction of his son. He succeeded also, in conjunction with St. Remigius, in converting an infamous house into a nunnery of pious virgins. According to the most common opinion, he died on the 1st of July, 533.

It is said that King Thierri assisted at his funeral, and esteemed himself honoured in being one of his bearers to the grave. His relics, lest they should be exposed to the impiety of the Normans, were hidden under ground, but discovered in 976, and are still preserved in a silver shrine. He is mentioned on this day in the Roman Martyrology. See Mabillon, Act. t. 1. p. 614. Bulteau, Hist. de l’Ordre de St. Ben. t. 1. p. 287; Baillet ad 1. Jul. and Gall. Christ. Nov. t. 9. p. 180.

== Baring-Gould's account ==
Sabine Baring-Gould (1834–1924), in his Lives of the Saints, wrote under July 1:

S. THEODORIC, P.H. (A.D. 533.)
[Galilean and Modern Roman Martyrologies. Usuardus, Maurolycus, &c. Authorities :—A life by Flodoard, in his history of the church of Rheims, written about A.D. 965; and an earlier life published by Mabillon and the Bollandists, from which Flodoard probably drew most of his information.]

THEODORIC, or Theudric, son of Marquard of Anancourt, or Alamannd, as the place was then called, near Rheims, was brought up by S. Remigius, and as soon as he was of age, was married by the advice of his parents to a girl of suitable rank. But Theodoric at once informed his bride that his purpose was to live as a monk, and she, in disgust. left him.

Theodoric then applied to Susanna, a venerable woman at Rheims, who was regarded as a proficient in the religious life, and asked her to give him advice. She recommended him to seek out a spot on the forest-grown Mont d'Or, near Rheims, where he might build a monastery. He went into the forest with Susanna, and saw a white eagle circling round the top of one of the hills, and took that as an indication of the site of his monastery.

He had the satisfaction of seeing his father Marquard embrace the religious life under him, and not less to hear that his bride, who really had been passionately attached to him, unable to bear the thoughts of a union with any-one else, after having given her young heart to Theodoric, had retired from the world into the cloister.

King Thierry, son of Clovis, is said to have been cured of ophthalmia by the saint touching his eyes with oil. His relics are preserved at S. Thierry, near Rheims.

== Sources ==
- Baring-Gould, S. (1897), The Lives Of The Saints: Volume 06, June, London: J. C. Nimmo This article incorporates text from this source, which is in the public domain.
- Butler, Alban (1821), The lives of the fathers, martyrs, and other principal saints, vol. VII, London: John Murphy This article incorporates text from this source, which is in the public domain.
- St. Augustine's Abbey, Ramsgate (1921), The Book of saints : a dictionary of servants of God canonized by the Catholic Church, London: A. & C. Black, ltd. This article incorporates text from this source, which is in the public domain.
