= Saint-Thierry =

- Commune
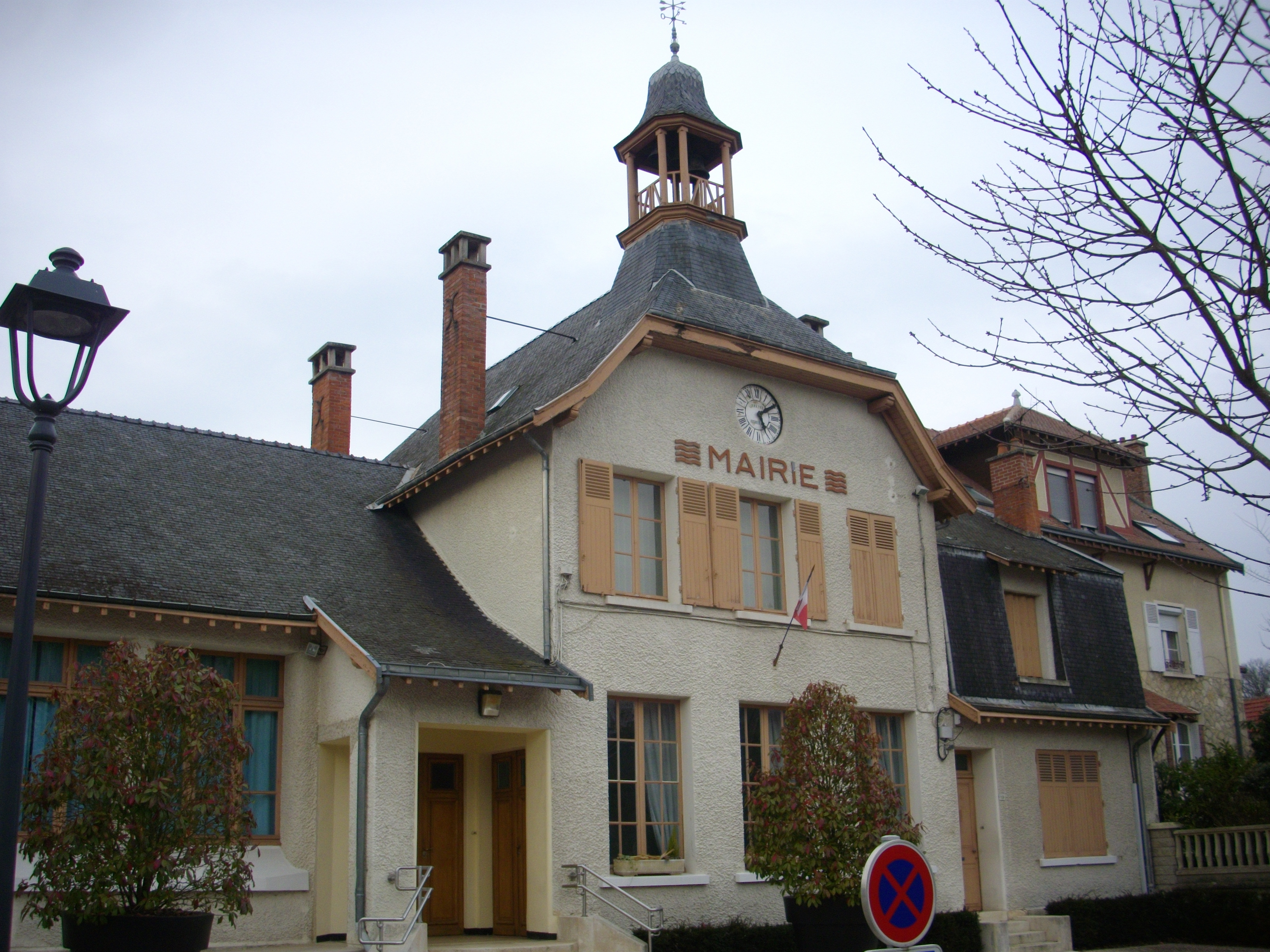
- The town hall in Saint-Thierry

- Coat of arms
- Location of Saint-Thierry
- Location within France Location within Grand Est
- Coordinates: 49°18′15″N 3°57′52″E
- Country: France
- Region: Grand Est
- Department: Marne
- Arrondissement: Reims
- Canton: Bourgogne-Fresne
- Intercommunality: CU Grand Reims

Government
  - Mayor (2020–2026): Antoine Lemaire
- Area^{1}: 7.59 km^{2} (2.93 sq mi)
- Elevation: 145 m (476 ft)
- Population (2023): 605
  - Density: 79.7/km^{2} (206/sq mi)
- Time zone: UTC+01:00 (CET)
  - Summer (DST): UTC+02:00 (CEST)
- INSEE/Postal code: 51518 /51220
- ^{1} French Land Register data, which excludes lakes, ponds, glaciers > 1 km^{2} (0.386 sq mi or 247 acres) and river estuaries.

Saint-Thierry (French pronunciation: [sɛ̃ tjɛʁi]) is a commune in the Marne department in north-eastern France.

== History ==
The village is named after Saint Thierry of Mont d'Hor, who founded the Saint-Thierry Abbey. William of Saint-Thierry was elected abbot here in 1119. It was here that he wrote De natura et dignitate amoris ("On the Nature and Dignity of Love") and De contemplando Deo ("On the Contemplation of God"). On 16 April 1917 Saint-Thierry was the site of one of the soviets of the Russian Revolution when soldiers of the 1st Brigade of the Russian Expeditionary Force in France formed a soldiers committee on learning of the February Revolution.

== See also ==
- Communes of the Marne department
