= Irénée Hausherr =

French priest and theologian (1881–1978)

Irénée Hausherr (7 June 1881, Eguisheim – 5 December 1978, Colmar) was a Jesuit of Alsatian origin and specialist in Greek patristic and monastic spirituality.

Ordained priest in 1923 after studies in the Netherlands, he became a professor at the Pontifical Oriental Institute in Rome, where he is claimed to have pioneered the study of the spirituality of the Christian East at an academic level. In this he was seconded by the future Cardinal Tomas Spidlik. Several of his works take their title from key terms of Desert spirituality, e.g., penthos; and philautia (philautie). He published mainly for the Pontifical Oriental Institute, also in Analecta Bollandiana, and Cistercian Publications, Kalamazoo. He was a specialist in Hesychasm.

== Selected works ==
Hausherr’s publications include;

- Penthos. La doctrine de la componction dans l'Orient Chrétien, 1944.
- Philautie: De la tendresse pour soi à la charité selon Saint Maxime le Confesseur, [Orientalia Christiana Analecta 137] Rome, 1952
- The name of Jesus, 1978
- Hausherr, Irénée (1990). Spiritual direction in the early Christian East. Translated by Gythiel, Anthony P. Kalamazoo, Michigan: Cistercian Publications. ISBN 978-0-87907-416-6.
- Solitude et vie contemplative d'apres l'Hesychasme
- L'Obéissance Religieuse
