= International Congress on Medieval Studies =

Annual academic conference in Michigan

The International Congress on Medieval Studies is an annual academic conference held for scholars specializing in, or with an interest in, medieval studies. It is sponsored by the Medieval Institute at the Western Michigan University in Kalamazoo, Michigan. The Congress is the largest annual gathering in the field, regularly attracting over three thousand registered participants from all over the world. The first conference took place in 1962.

== History ==
In 1962, the newly established Institute for Medieval Studies at Western Michigan University organized a biennial gathering known as the Conference on Medieval Studies. By 1970, participation had grown significantly and the gathering was made an annual affair. Unusual for the time, the organizers issued calls for papers which were open to all in the field who were interested, including graduate students (see Scope and Participation, below). In the program of the 50th Congress, John Sommerfeldt reminisces about the inception of the humble conference as a place where "bright young scholars could be heard." As the conference began to grow, he once noted that running it was like "entertaining some four thousand of my nearest and dearest friends."

In 1973, the Institute for Cistercian Studies was established at Western Michigan, and began to hold its annual Cistercian Studies Conference as a sub-set of the International Congress on Medieval Studies.

In 2020, due to rise of COVID-19, the 55th International Congress on Medieval Studies was canceled. The Congress moved to a virtual format for 2021, with both live and prerecorded session and a virtual exhibits hall.

== Structure ==
The Congress is typically held during the first or second week of May, and runs from Thursday morning through Sunday afternoon. Most events are held on the West Campus of Western Michigan University.

The archived schedule of the 42nd International Congress on Medieval studies, held in 2007, illustrates the structure and events of the conference as described below.

=== Sessions ===
Sessions form the bulk of the activity at the Congress. There are three main types of sessions:

- The vast majority of sessions are presentations of research. These sessions typically consist of between two and four presentations organized around a theme.
- A minority of sessions are organized as roundtable discussions, in which a discussion on a predetermined topic takes place in at least a partially spontaneous manner.
- A few sessions are organized as workshops, in which attendees are active participants.

Many sessions have a sponsoring group, although individuals or the Congress may organize sessions. Many of the sessions are sponsored by academic associations, universities, or publishers, while others are arranged by ad hoc groups which are interested in a particular topic.

Approximately six hundred sessions are held across twelve different time slots during the four days. Each session is scheduled to last ninety minutes.

=== Plenary Lectures ===
Two plenary lectures are given during the conference, at the beginning of the day on Friday and Saturday.

=== Exhibits Hall ===
The exhibits hall is open during the length of the Congress, and is composed primarily of book publishers selling their latest titles in the field of medieval studies. A minority of the hall also features handcrafts, music, and foodstuffs for sale. In 2007, approximately seventy exhibitors participated.

=== Meetings ===
The Congress serves as a rare chance for international societies of medieval specialists to gather in person, and dozens of business meetings are conducted during breaks between sessions. Many groups use the opportunity to plan for their presentations later in the summer at the International Medieval Congress held at Leeds University.

=== Entertainment and Attractions ===
The Congress typically features a film festival, screening movies which have a medieval setting or theme. There are also performances of medieval music and theater.

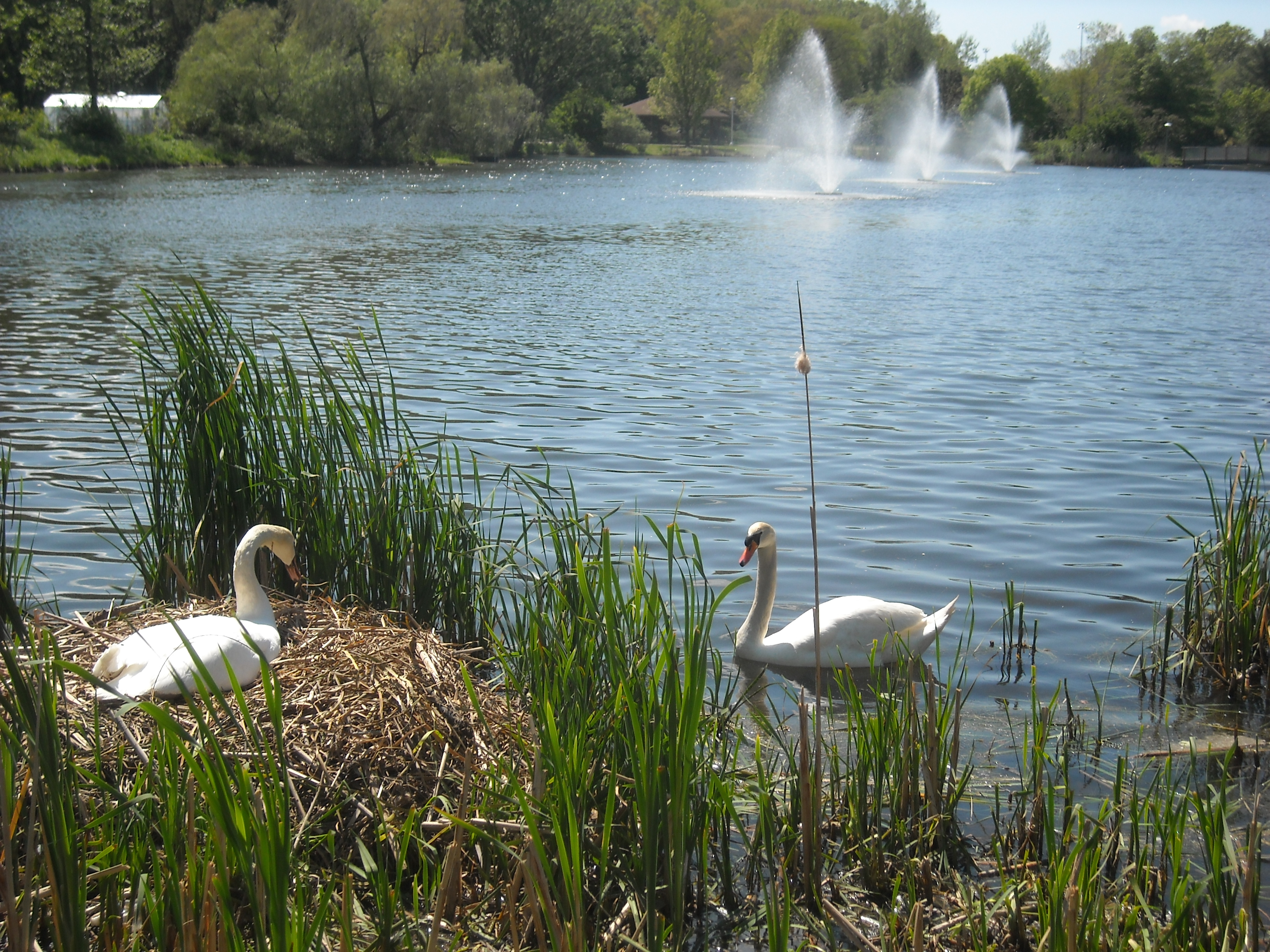
Swan nest at Goldsworth Pond.

== Scope and Participation ==
The Congress is very broad in scope, being open to all topics related to the medieval period and to participants from any background. This has served to set it apart from other meetings in the field. Topics may range from discussions of mysticism, numismatics, and medieval Latin, to modern medieval-themed video games, the works of J. R. R. Tolkien, and the teaching of medieval studies in the classroom. Presenters are not necessarily experts in medieval history; scholars of literature, theater, religion, and art frequently give presentations.

== See also ==
- Conferences in Medieval Studies
