= Grimlaicus =

Grimlaicus or Grimlaic was a cleric who lived in ninth- or tenth-century Francia, probably around Metz. He is known only for the book he wrote on how to lead a solitary life within a monastic community, the Regula Solitariorum. This was the first known rule written for hermits in the Latin West, drawing heavily on the Rule of St Benedict. The Regula begins with a prologue, followed by 69 sections, or chapters. Grimlaicus dedicated the compilation to his namesake, a priest. The latter, Mabillon conjectures, lived at the papal court during the pontificate of Formosus.
