= André Louf =

Belgian Cistercian monk, theologian, lecturer, author and translator

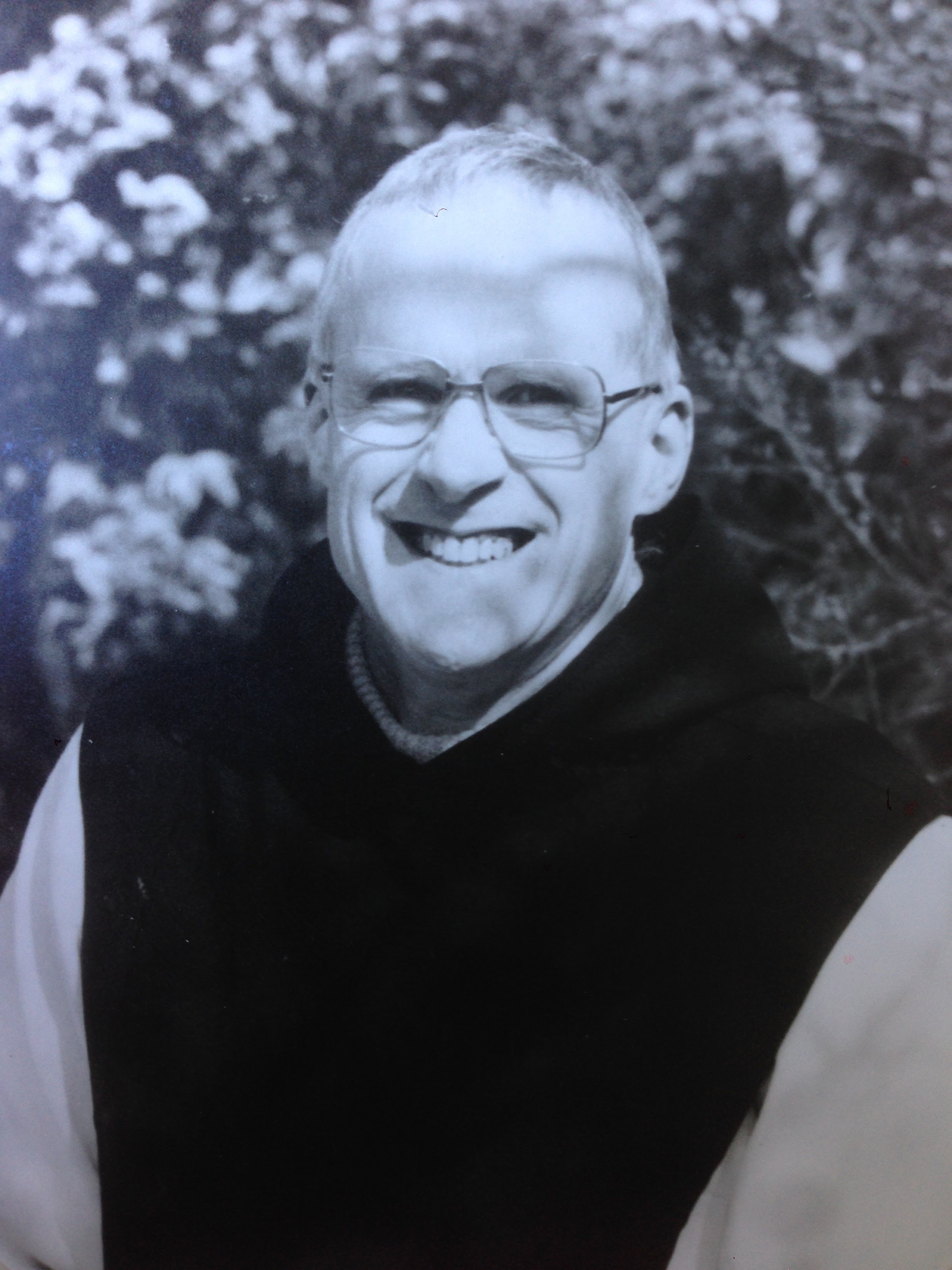
- Portrait of Andé Louf during the 1970s
- Born: André Louf; December 28, 1929; Louvain, Belgium
- Died: July 12, 2010; Mont des Cats, France
- Occupation(s): Monk, author, theologian
- Ordained: July 19, 1954

André Louf, OCSO (born 1929 in Leuven, Belgium; died 2010 in France) was a Belgian Cistercian monk, theologian, lecturer, author, and translator.

== Biography ==
Louf attended the Pontifical Biblical Institute and Pontifical Gregorian University in Rome. He entered the Cistercian Abbey of Mont-des-Cats, Berthen, France, in 1947, making his monastic profession in 1949 and solemn profession in 1954. On January 10, 1963, he was elected abbot of the monastery, a position he held for thirty-five years until he retired in 1997, when he became a hermit in Simiane-Collongue. In 2010, he died at Mont-des-Cats, where he is buried.

== Writing ==
Louf was general editor of the highly regarded theological series, "Collectanea Cisterciensia" and author of numerous books published mainly by Cistercian Publications. His writing brings together spiritual experience both from his life of prayer and his experience as part of a monastic community.

Louf has translated many works into French, including the works of Isaac the Syrian.

His books in English include:

- The Cistercian Way (1983)
- Tuning in to Grace (1992)
- Teach us to Pray (1992)
- Grace can do More (1995)
- Mercy in Weakness (1998)
- In the School of Contemplation (2004)
- The Way of Humility (2007)

== Bibliography ==
- The Message of Monastic Spirituality, New York 1964.
- Heer, leer ons bidden. Iets gewar worden van God. (Reeks ‘Doortocht’), Tielt 21973.
- Seigneur, apprends-nous à prier. Bruxelles 1973.
- In uns betet der Geist. (Beten heute 5). Einsiedeln 1974.
- Teach us to pray. Learning a little about God, London 1974.
- Demut und Gehorsam bei der Einführung ins Mönchsleben, (Münsterschwarzacher Kleinschriften 5). Münsterschwarzach 1979.
- Niets boven de liefde. Woorden van een abt ter meditatie, Tielt 21980.
- with Jacomon, Sophia M. (transl.): Saint Nil Sorsky (1433-1508). La vie, les écrits, le skite d'un starets de Trans-Volga, (Spiritualité orientale 32). Abbaye de Bellefontaine 1980.
- La voie cistercienne. À l’école de l’amour. Paris 1980.
- El camino cisterciense. En la escuela del amor (Caminos al andar 1). Estella (Navarra) 1981.
- The Cistercian Way (Cistercian Studies Series 76). Kalamazoo/Mich. 1989.
- Secrètes clartés sur le chemin de Dieu. Cisterciens-Trappistes (La Tradition Vivante). Épinay-sur-Seine 1981.
- Seul l'amour suffirait - Commentaires d'Évangile, pour les années A, B, C. Paris 1982–1984.
- Inspelen op genade. Over God-zoeken (Woord en Beleving). Tielt 1983.
- Au gré de sa grâce. Propos sur la prière. Paris 1989.
- Tuning in to Grace. The Quest for God. London 1992.
- with Dufner, Meinrad: Geistliche Vaterschaft (Münsterschwarzacher Kleinschriften 26). Münsterschwarzach 1984.
- with Grün, Anselm: In brüderlicher Gemeinschaft leben (Münsterschwarzacher Kleinschriften 33). Münsterschwarzach 1986.
- La grâce peut davantage - l'accompagnement spirituel. Paris 1992.
- Die Gnade kann mehr… Geistliche Begleitung. Münsterschwarzach 1995.
- Heureuse faiblesse - Commentaires d'Évangile, pour les années A, B, C. Paris 1996–1998.
- À la grâce de Dieu - Entretiens avec Stéphane Delberghe. Namur 2002.
- Humilité. Les-Plans-sur-Bex 2002.
- with Huerre, Denis: Dieu intime. Paroles de moines. Paris 2003.
- À l'école de la contemplation. Paris 2004.
- Oeuvre de Dieu. Un chemin de prière. Paris 2005.
- Cherche Dieu et ton coeur revivra - Hildegard Michaelis (1900-1982). Paris 2006.
- Saint Bruno et le charisme cartusien aujourd'hui. (Présence cartusienne). Les-Plans-sur-Bex 2009.
- ‘Une théologie de la pauvreté monastique chez le bienheureux Guerric d'Igny’ In: Collectanea Ordinis Cisterciensium Reformatorum 20 (1958), p.[207]-222, [362]-373.
- ‘Die Acedia bei Evagrius Ponticus’ In: Concilium 10 (1974), p. 682-685.
- 'Solitudo Pluralis' In: Solitude and Communion ed. A. M. Allchin. SLG Press, 1977.
- ‘La faiblesse, un chemin pascal selon saint Bernard’ In: Collectanea cisterciensia 65 (2003), p. 5-20.
- ‘Die Mönche des Westens und der Berg Athos im 20. Jahrhundert’ In: Cistercienserchronik 113 (2006), p. 415-427.
