= Chrysogonus Waddell =

American theologian and monk

Chrysogonus Waddell OCSO (March 1, 1930 – November 23, 2008) was an American Roman Catholic convert and theologian. A Trappist monk of the Abbey of Gethsemani, Kentucky, he was an accomplished organist, liturgist, historian, and a scholar of chant and Cistercian liturgy.

== Biography ==
Thomas Waddell, born on March 1, 1930, in the Philippines, where his parents, Joel and Bernice Waddell, serving in the military, were stationed. Waddell had a younger sister, Shirlie Lorene. Waddell grew up in an Episcopalian family. He studied music composition with Vincent Persichetti at the Philadelphia Conservatory and converted to Catholicism in 1949. On August 2, 1950, he entered the novitiate at the Trappist Abbey of Our Lady of Gethsemani and made solemn vows there on November 1, 1955; his name in religion was Chrysogonus. Priestly ordination followed on May 31, 1958, after which Fr. Chrysogonus was sent for doctoral studies to the Roman Benedictine Pontifical Atheneum of St. Anselm. This was the beginning of his life's work as an internationally respected scholar of the Cistercian liturgy and the Order's history. A founding editor of Liturgy OSCO, his more than 100 publications on Cistercian liturgy set the tone for a generation.

As was the case with his confrere Thomas Merton, Waddell lived for decades as a hermit, not in the monastic enclosure. Yet he still served as Regens chori (conductor of the choir) and accompanied festive liturgies on the organ. He contributed intensely to his abbey's liturgical reforms after the Second Vatican Council, translating many texts from Latin into English. He was a member of the International Commission on English in the Liturgy (ICEL) and a sought-after speaker at conferences in the USA and abroad.

He died at the abbey infirmary on November 23, 2008, the Feast of Christ the King. His working papers are on file at the Western Michigan University Library's Special Collections.

Waddell's a cappella choral piece “Rosa Mystica”, sung by the University of Notre Dame Folk Choir, is featured in the final scene of the film “Lady Bird”.

== Publications ==
Waddell published five books, more than 175 articles, and many introductions to the works of medieval Cistercian writers.

- Twelfth-Century Statutes from the Cistercian General Chapter: Latin Text with English Notes and Commentary. Studia et Documenta 12. Cistercian: Commentarii Cistercienses, 2002.ISBN 9080543942
- Shall we really wash our hands in the blood of sinners?,Cistercian Studies Quarterly (CSQ) 44:4 (2009), S. 435–445.
- The Primitive Cistercian Breviary (Staatsbibliothek zu Berlin, Preußischer Kulturbesitz, Ms. Lat. Oct. 402), with Variants from the "Bernardine" Cistercian Breviary, Fribourg: Academic Press, 2007.
- The hidden years of Ælred of Rievaulx: the formation of a spiritual master, in: (CSQ) 41:1 (2006) 51-63
- To Metz - but where in Metz? And when?, in: (CSQ) 41:4 (2006), S. 403–419.
- A Corpus liturgicum Cisterciense saeculi duodecimi: a Tribute to John Sommerfeldt’, in: Truth as Gift: Studies in Medieval Cistercian History in Honor of John R. Sommerfeldt. (Hg.) Marsha L. Dutton, Daniel M. La Corte and Paul Lockey, Kalamazoo: Cistercian Publications, 2004, S. 169–198.
- "Adtendite a falsis prophetis": Abaelard's earliest known anti-Cistercian diatribe’, in: (CSQ) 39:4 (2004), S. 371–398.
- Cistercian influence on the abbey of the Paraclete?: plotting data from the Paraclete book of burials, customary, and necrology’, in: Perspectives for an Architecture of Solitude: Essays on Cistercians, Art and Architecture in Honour of Peter Fergusson. Hg. Terry N. Kinder, Medieval Church Studies 11; Studia et Documenta 13. Turnhout: Brepol, 2004, S. 329–340.
- Saint Bernard of Clairvaux, sweet singer of Israel: the textual reform of the primitive Cistercian breviary, in: (CSQ) 38:4 (2003), S. 439–448.
- Cistercian Lay Brothers. Twelfth-Century Usages with Related Texts. Edited by Chrysogonus Waddell. (Studia et Documents 10). Citeaux: Commentarii Cistercienses, 2000.
- Narrative and Legislative Texts from Early Citeaux. Latin Text in Dual Edition with English Translation and Notes. Citeaux: Commentarii Cistercienses, 1999.
- "Viduata suo pastore: A Brief Note". In: E. Rozanne Elder (ed.), The New Monastery. Texts and Studies of the Earliest Cistercians. Kalamazoo, MI 1998, p. 35-44.
- Praise no less than charity. Studies in honor of M. Chrysogonus Waddell, monk of Gethsemani Abbey, Hg. E. Rozanne Elder, Kalamazoo: Cistercian Publications, 2002.
