= John R. Sommerfeldt =

American academic (1933–2023)

John R. Sommerfeldt (February 4, 1933 – December 4, 2023) was an American university professor, medievalist and scholar of Cistercian Studies.

== Life and work ==
He was born in Detroit, Michigan. As a young man, John Robert Sommerfeldt wanted to become a monk at the Trappist Abbey of Gethsemani, but left because of poor health. He enrolled at the University of Michigan in Ann Arbor in 1951 and received all his degrees there, culminating with the doctorate in 1960. His dissertation was on Consistency of Thought in the Works of Bernard of Clairvaux. A Study of Mystical Leadership in the Twelfth Century. A version of it was published as „The Epistemological value of Mysticism in the Thought of Bernard of Clairvaux" in: Studies in Medieval Culture (Kalamazoo 1964).

=== Kalamazoo ===
He moved to Western Michigan University in Kalamazoo and founded the Medieval Institute there. Beginning in 1962, he organized the bi-annual (annual as of 1970) Conference on Medieval Studies, renaming it International Congress on Medieval Studies in 1979. He was particularly devoted to finding and encouraging young scholars, which was unusual at the time. Because of several factors, among them Kalamazoo's central location, the conference developed quickly into a thriving event. The Center for Cistercian and Monastic Studies emerged from it. In 1973, Sommerfeldt was instrumental in moving the editorial offices of Cistercian Publications to Kalamazoo. His successor as director of the Medieval Institute was Otto Gründler (1928–2004).

=== Irving (Texas) ===
Sommerfeldt transferred to the private Catholic University of Dallas in Irving (Texas) in 1977. Another respected historian of the Cistercian Order, the Cistercian monk Louis Julius Lekai, taught there. Sommerfeldt served as University President from 1978 to 1980, was Dean of Constantin College of Liberal Arts and taught Medieval Studies until retirement.

=== Scholarship ===
Sommerfeldt has been called a "noted and prolific medievalist" and was considered to be an expert on the Cistercian monks Bernard of Clairvaux and Aelred of Rievaulx. A Festschrift was published in 2004, titled Truth as Gift.

== Publications ==
=== As author ===
- The spiritual teachings of Bernard of Clairvaux. An intellectual history of the early Cistercian order. Cistercian Publications, Kalamazoo 1991.
- Bernard of Clairvaux on the life of the mind. Newman Press, New York 2004.
- Bernard of Clairvaux on the spirituality of relationship. Newman Press, New York 2004.
- Aelred of Rievaulx. Pursuing perfect happiness. Newman Press, New York 2005.
- Aelred of Rievaulx on love and order in the world and the church. Newman Press, New York 2006.
- Christianity in Culture. A Historical Quest. University Press of America, Lanham 2009.
- The Flight and Fall of the Eagle. A History of Medieval Germany 800–1648. Hamilton Books, Lanham 2017.

=== As editor ===
- Studies in medieval culture. Western Michigan University, Kalamazoo 1962.
- Studies in medieval culture. Western Michigan University, Kalamazoo 1964.
- Studies in medieval culture [Third biennial conference on medieval studies, held in Kalamazoo, Michigan, March 17–19, 1966]. Western Michigan university, Medieval institute, Kalamazoo 1970.
- (with Larry Syndergaard, 1936–2015, and E. Rozanne Elder, * 1940) Studies in medieval culture [Fourth conference on medieval studies, held in Kalamazoo, Michigan, March 13–15, 1968]. Western Michigan University, Medieval Institute, Kalamazoo 1973.
- Studies in medieval Cistercian history. 2 Bde. Cistercian publications, Kalamazoo 1974–1976.
- (with Thomas H. Seiler) Studies in medieval culture. Western Michigan University, The Medieval Institute, Kalamazoo 1977.
- Cistercian Ideals and Reality. Cistercian publications, Kalamazoo 1978.
- Simplicity and ordinariness. Cistercian publications, Kalamazoo 1980.
- (with E. Rozanne Elder) The chimaera of his age. Studies on Bernard of Clairvaux. Cistercian Publications, Kalamazoo 1980.
- Abba. Guides to wholeness and holiness, East and West. Papers presented at a Symposium on Spiritual Fatherhood/Motherhood at the Abbey of New Clairvaux, Vina, California, June 12–16, 1978. Cistercian publications, Kalamazoo 1982.
- Erudition at God's service. Cistercian publications, Kalamazoo 1987.
- Bernardus magister. Papers presented at the Nonacentenary celebration of the birth of Saint Bernard of Clairvaux, Kalamazoo, Michigan, Western Michigan University, May 10–13, 1990. Cistercian Publications, Spencer, Mass., 1992.
- (with Francis Roy Swietek) Studiosorum speculum. Studies in Honor of Louis J. Lekai, O.Cist. Cistercian Publications, Kalamazoo 1993.

=== Secondary Sources ===
- Truth as gift. Studies in Medieval Cistercian history in honor of John R. Sommerfeldt, ed. Marsha L. Dutton, Daniel M. La Corte und Paul Lockey. Cistercian Publications, Kalamazoo 2004, p. 575–588 (curriculum vitae).
