= Valjouffrey =

- Commune
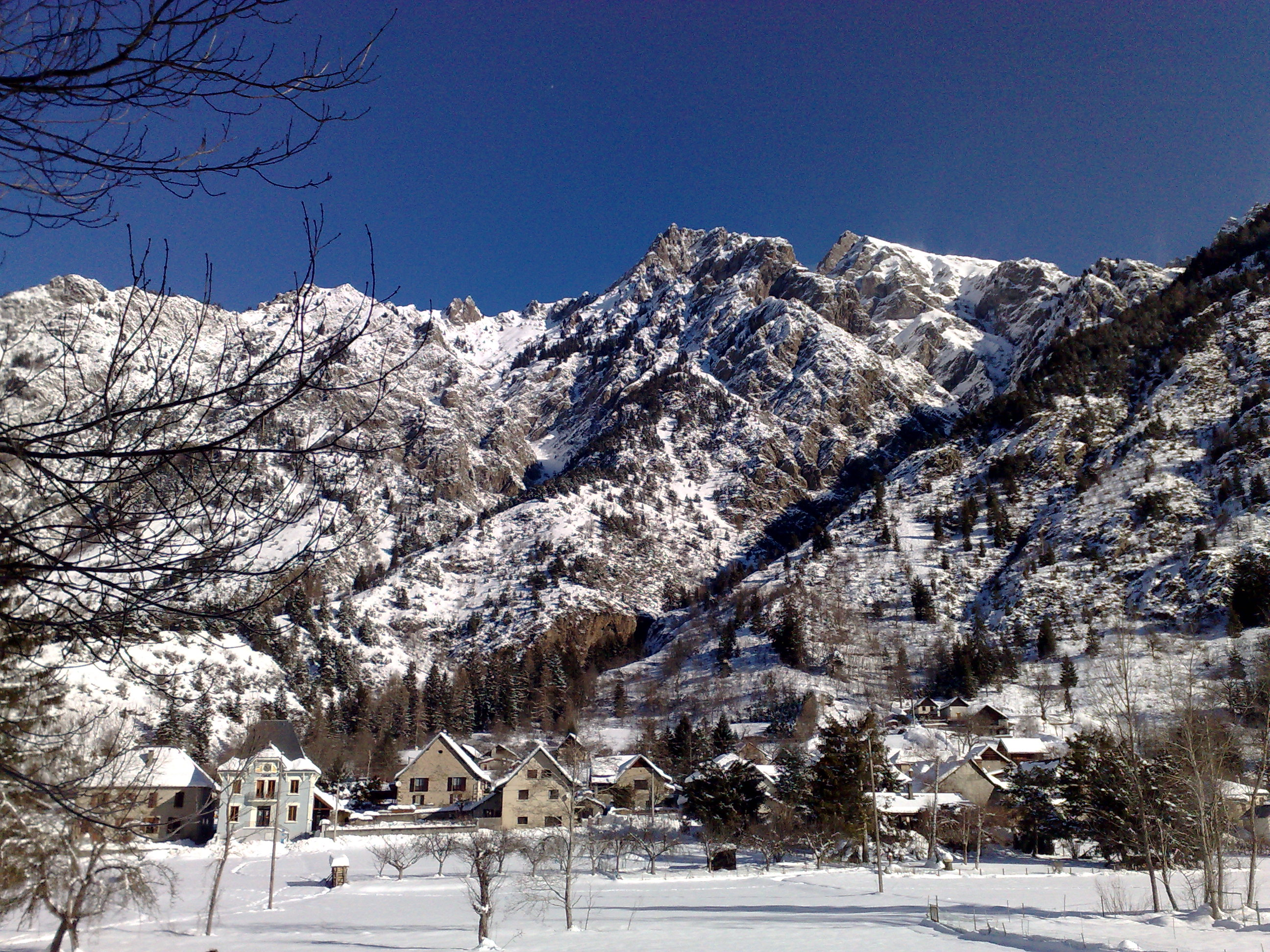
- Valjouffrey in winter
- Location of Valjouffrey
- Location within France Location within Auvergne-Rhône-Alpes
- Coordinates: 44°52′23″N 6°01′55″E
- Country: France
- Region: Auvergne-Rhône-Alpes
- Department: Isère
- Arrondissement: Grenoble
- Canton: Matheysine-Trièves

Government
  - Mayor (2022–2026): Maxence Foglia
- Area^{1}: 127.55 km^{2} (49.25 sq mi)
- Elevation: 1,014 m (3,327 ft)
- Highest elevation: 3,564 m (11,693 ft)
- Lowest elevation: 923 m (3,028 ft)
- Population (2023): 167
  - Density: 1.31/km^{2} (3.39/sq mi)
- Time zone: UTC+01:00 (CET)
  - Summer (DST): UTC+02:00 (CEST)
- INSEE/Postal code: 38522 /38740
- ^{1} French Land Register data, which excludes lakes, ponds, glaciers > 1 km^{2} (0.386 sq mi or 247 acres) and river estuaries.

Valjouffrey (French pronunciation: [valʒufʁɛ]) is a commune in the Isère department in southeastern France.

== Population ==
Historical population
| Year | Pop. | ±% p.a. |
|---|---|---|
| 1968 | 124 | — |
| 1975 | 109 | −1.83% |
| 1982 | 107 | −0.26% |
| 1990 | 164 | +5.48% |
| 1999 | 156 | −0.55% |
| 2007 | 137 | −1.61% |
| 2012 | 156 | +2.63% |
| 2017 | 135 | −2.85% |
| 2023 | 167 | +3.61% |
Source: INSEE

== See also ==
- Communes of the Isère department
