= Saint-Thierry Abbey =

Catholic abbey in Saint-Thierry, France

- l'Abbaye du Mont d'Hor
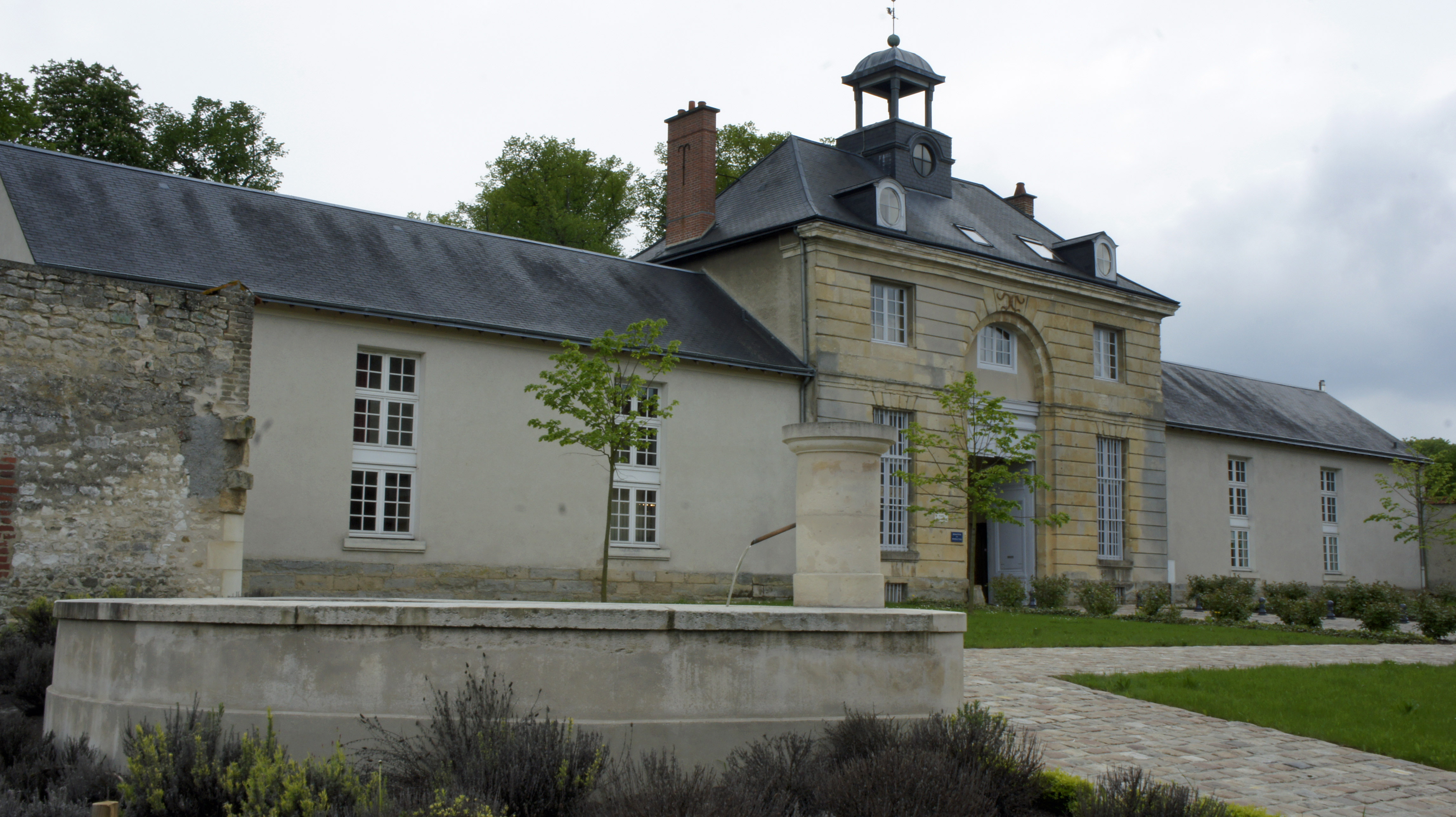
- Entrance of the Abbey

- Location within France
- Interactive map of Saint-Thierry Abbey

Monastery information
- Order: Benedictines
- Denomination: Catholic Church
- Established: c. 500
- Dedication: Saint Thierry
- Archdiocese: Reims

Architecture
- Heritage designation: Classé MH 1926–1932

Site
- Location: Saint-Thierry, Marne, Champagne-Ardenne
- Country: France
- Coordinates: 49.3047°N 3.9655°E
- Website: www.benedictines-ste-bathilde.fr/les-monasteres/monastere-de-saint-thierry/

Saint-Thierry Abbey (French: Abbaye de Saint-Thierry) was formerly a Benedictine abbey in the village of Saint-Thierry, Marne, It was closed in the 17th century and razed to the ground during the French Revolution. Since 1968 it has been a Benedictine nunnery in the Archdiocese of Reims.

== History ==
The abbey was founded by Theodoric of Mont d'Hor around 500 and dedicated to Saint Bartholomew the Apostle. This men's abbey became Benedictine around 974 and Adalbero of Reims had Thierry's relics transferred to the monastery. The cult of Thierry supplanted that of Bartholomew in the long term.

It became a monastery of the Congregation of Saint Maur from 1627/1628 until its suppression. It was abolished on 2 April 1695 by King Louis XIV. (Note: Letters and procedures for the extinction of the title of the abbey of S. Thierry, at Mont d'Or, of the order of S. Benoist and of the Diocese of Reims, and for the union of the fruits and revenues of the property of the said Abbey to the Archbishopric of Reims are preserved in BM Reims, CR IV 268 M.) This was to compensate for the damage that the Church of Reims suffered during the creation of the Archdiocese of Cambrai. This extinction was ratified by a papal bull of Pope Innocent XII dated 13 September 1696, and it became the secondary residence of the archbishops of Reims. In 1777 the community was driven out and the abbey completely razed; the community being relocated for a time to Reims. Only the chapter house, dating from the 12th century, remained standing.

Bernard de Montfaucon made an inventory of the books of the abbey in his Bibliotheca bibliecarum manuscriptorum nova, Paris, 1739, and there are still nearly 150, mostly in the Municipal Library of Reims as well as a few copies in the Vatican Library and the Bibliothèque nationale de France

After two centuries of interruption, monastic life resumed on the hill of Saint-Thierry when the Benedictines of the Vanves congregation arrived in 1968. The long tradition of prayer, hospitality and work began to be reborn.

== List of abbots and commendatory abbots ==
- 1st abbot : After 512 – 1 July 533 : Saint Theodoric of Mont d'Hor
- 2nd abbot :
- 3rd abbot : 544 – 1 May 590 : Saint Théodulphe or Thiou
- The bishops of Reims reserved the right to be abbot of Saint-Thierry until introduction of the Benedictine rule
- c. 971–985 : Airard
- 988-991 : Christian
- 991-992 : Adso of Montier-en-Der
- 992 - : Josbert
- 1008-1022 : Dominique
- 1049-1063 : Albet
- 1065-1078 : Raimbaud ou Clarembault
- 1078-1088 : Richier
- 1089-1112 : Raoul
- 1112-1121 : Geoffroy col de cerf
- 1121-1135 : William of St-Thierry
- 1135-1145 : Hellin
- 1145-1156 : Aldric
- 1157-1167 : Albert
- 1167-1186 : Herbert
- 1187-1197 : Gaucher
- 1197-1215 : Foulques, died in Rome during the Fourth Council of the Lateran
- 1216-1233 : Millon
- 1233-1261 : Gérard
- 1261-1300 : Jean de Fago
- 1301-1312 : Raoul de Sarcey
- 1313-1337 : Jean de Dormans
- 1337-1349 : Raoul de Cormicy
- 1349-1361 : Clarin de Cormicy
- 1360-1363 : Pierre de Marcilly
- 1363-1369 : Albéric de Laporte
- 1370-1395 : Guillaume de Baracan
- 1396-1410 : Étienne de Meligny
- 1411-1431 : Fouchard de Rochechouart
- 1432-1437 : Guillaume Fillastre
- 1437-1460 : Aimery de Hocquedé
- 1461-1469 : Guillaume du Fou
- 1469-1491 : Jean Balue
- 1491-1522 : Gilles d'Ostrel
- 1522-1547 : François d'Ostrel
- 1568-1595 : Dominique Mangin
- 1595-1599 : Jacques de Bailly
- 1599-1613 : Charles de Bailly
- 1613-1649 : Paul de Bailly (commendatory)
- Last abbé : Guillaume Bailly.

== Gallery ==
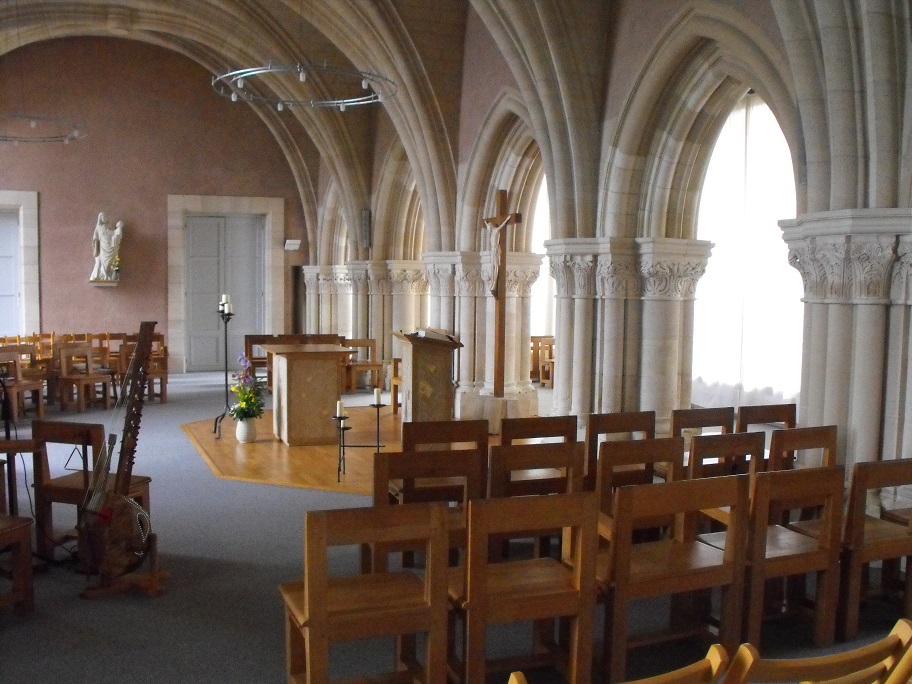
Classified Chapter Hall.

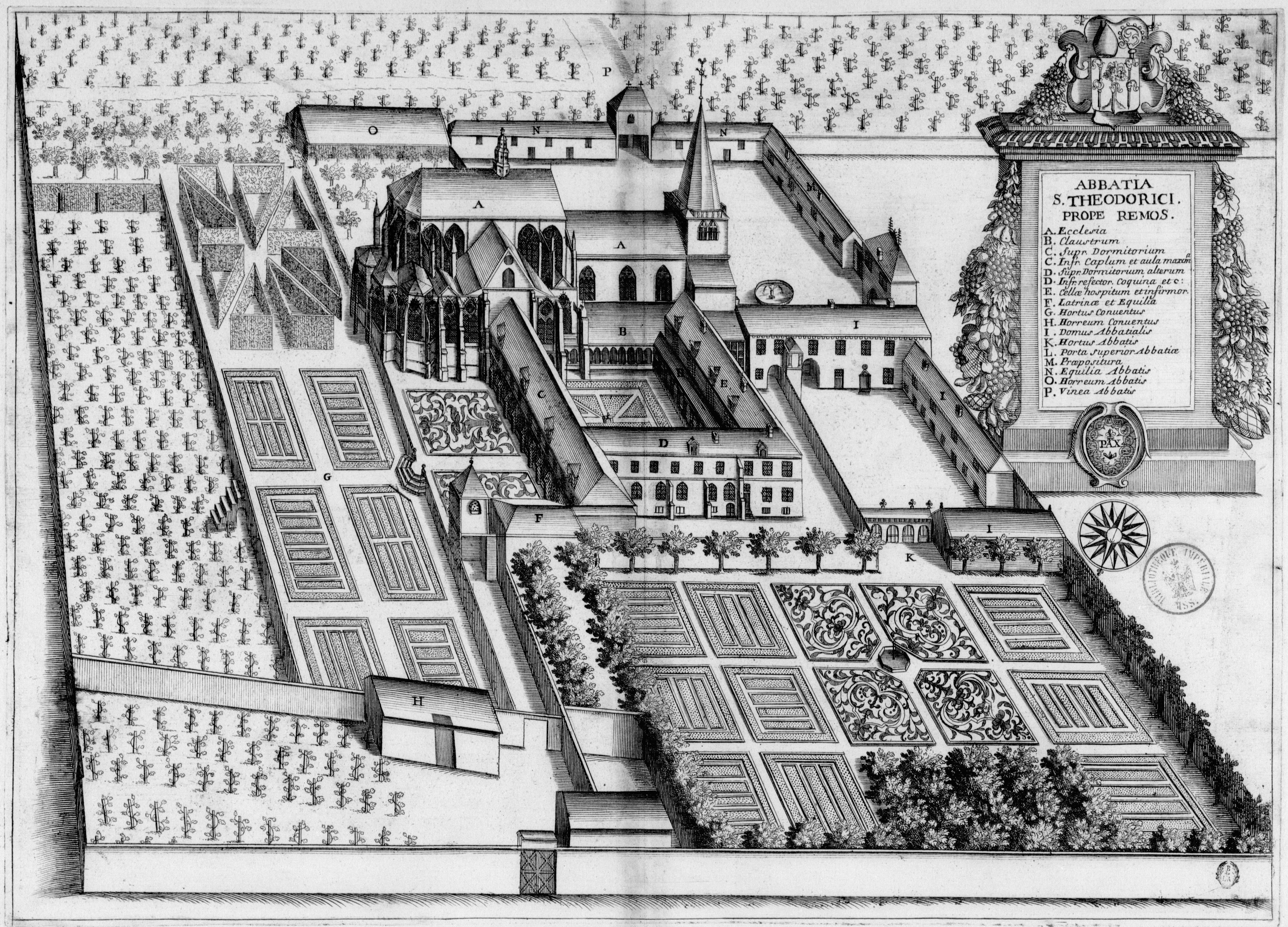
View of the abbey before its destruction.

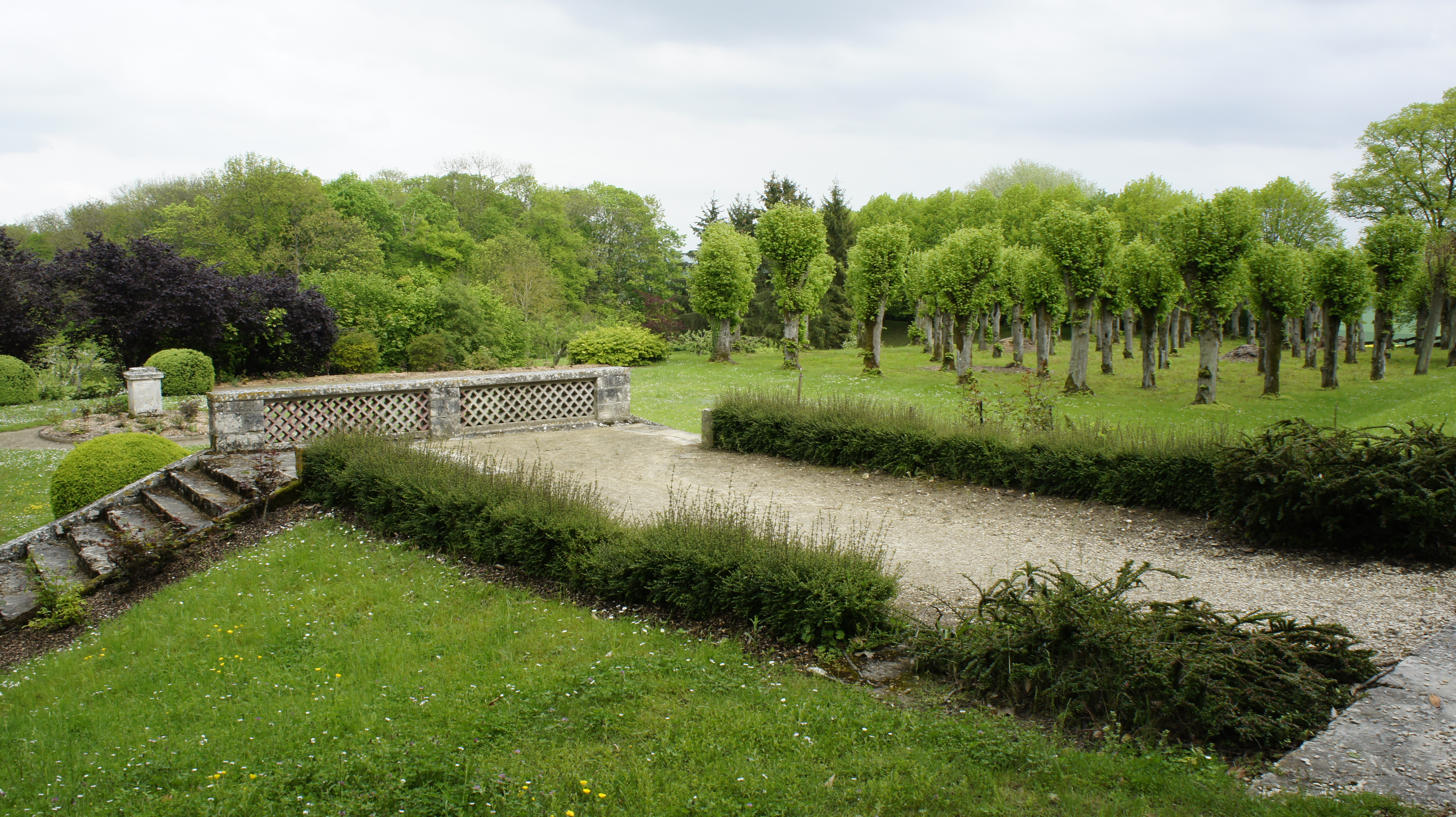
Garden

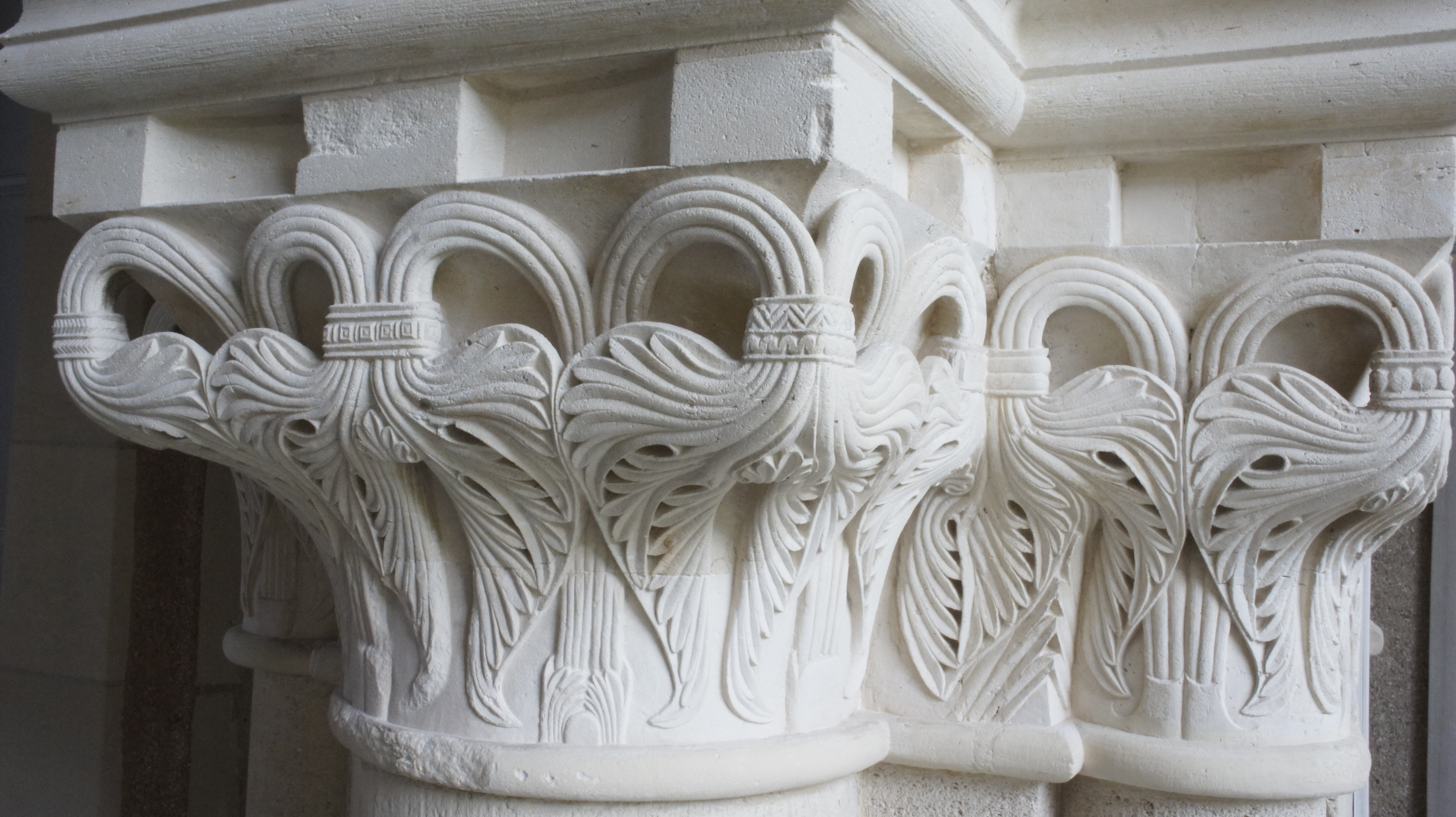
Capital

== Sources ==
- Escallier, Eugène Alexis (1852), "VII", L'Abbaye d'Anchin 1079-1792 (in French), Lille: L. Lefort
- Ourlier, Jacques (11–14 October 1976), "Le monastère de Saint-Thierry aux époques mérovingienne et carolingienne", Actes du colloque international d'histoire monastique (in French)
