= Meredith Lillich =

American art historian (1932–2026)

- Born: February 9, 1932; Chicago, Illinois, U.S.
- Died: May 18, 2026 (aged 94); Syracuse, New York, U.S.
- Occupation: Art historian
- Spouse: Richard B. Lillich
- Awards: Guggenheim Fellowship (2007)

Academic background
- Education: Oberlin College; Cornell University; Columbia University
- Thesis: The Stained Glass of Saint-Père de Chartres (1969)

Academic work
- Discipline: Art historian
- Sub-discipline: Medieval stained glass
- Institutions: Syracuse University

Meredith Parsons Lillich (February 9, 1932 – March 18, 2026) was an American art historian. She specialized in medieval stained glass, and wrote several books on the topic, including The Stained Glass of Saint-Père de Chartres (1978), Rainbow Like an Emerald (1991), and The Gothic Stained Glass of Reims Cathedral (2011). Lillich was a 2007 Guggenheim Fellow and was an Emeritus Professor of Art History at Syracuse University.

== Life and career ==
Lillich was born in Chicago, Illinois, on February 9, 1932, the daughter of Allan D. Parsons. She obtained a BA from Oberlin College in 1953, and after studying art history as a 1953-1954 Fulbright Fellow at the Free University of Brussels, an MA from Cornell University in 1957. She later obtained a PhD from Columbia University in 1969; her doctoral dissertation was titled The Stained Glass of Saint-Père de Chartres.

In 1968, Lillich became an instructor at Syracuse University. She was promoted to assistant professor in 1969, associate professor in 1973, and full professor in 1981. She was director of the 1980 National Endowment for the Humanities (NEH) Summer Seminar for College Teachers. She was also a 1976 NEH Fellow in Paris, a 1980-1981 American Council of Learned Societies Fellow, a 1981 and 1987-1988 Center for Advanced Study in the Visual Arts Visiting Senior Fellow, a 1983 Fulbright Senior Research Fellow in Paris, and a 1988 Institute for Advanced Study Fellow. She was awarded Syracuse University's 1987 William Wasserstrom Prize for Outstanding Graduate Teaching.

She specialized in medieval stained glass. Books she authored include The Stained Glass of Saint-Père de Chartres (1978) - which won a Millard Meiss Publication Fund grant - Rainbow Like an Emerald: Stained Glass in Lorraine in the Thirteenth and Early Fourteenth Centuries (1991), The Armor of Light: Stained Glass in Western France, 1250-1325 (1994) and Stained Glass Before 1700 in Upstate New York (2004). In 2007, she was awarded a Guggenheim Fellowship to study the stained glass of Reims Cathedral; this allowed her to write her next book The Gothic Stained Glass of Reims Cathedral (2007).

In 1953, she married legal scholar Richard B. Lillich.

Lillich died at her home in Syracuse, New York, on March 18, 2026, at the age of 94.

== Works ==
- A Redating of the Thirteenth-Century Grisaille Windows of Chartres Cathedral (1972)
- The Stained Glass of Saint-Père de Chartres (1978) (Note: Reviews of this book:)
- (as editor) Studies in Cistercian Art and Architecture, I and II (1982 and 1984)
- Rainbow Like an Emerald: Stained Glass in Lorraine in the Thirteenth and Early Fourteenth Centuries (1991) (Note: Reviews of this book:)
- The Armor of Light: Stained Glass in Western France, 1250-1325 (1994)
- The Queen of Sicily and Gothic Stained Glass in Mussy and Tonnerre (1998)
- (as editor) Cistercian Nuns and Their World (2005)
- The Gothic Stained Glass of Reims Cathedral (2011) (Note: Reviews of this book:)
