= Tomáš Špidlík =

Czech Catholic prelate (1919–2010)

His Eminence Tomáš Špidlík S.J.
- Cardinal-Deacon of Sant'Agata de' Goti
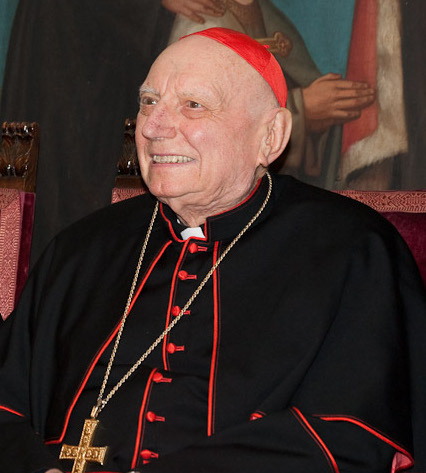
- Špidlík in Rome
- Church: Roman Catholic Church
- Appointed: 21 October 2003
- Installed: 5 February 2004
- Term ended: 16 April 2010
- Predecessor: Silvio Angelo Pio Oddi
- Successor: Raymond Leo Burke

Orders
- Ordination: 22 August 1949
- Created cardinal: 21 October 2003 by Pope John Paul II
- Rank: Cardinal-Deacon

Personal details
- Born: Tomáš Špidlík; 17 December 1919 Boskovice, Moravia, Czechoslovakia (modern-Czech Republic)
- Died: 16 April 2010 (aged 90) Centro Ezio Aletti, Rome, Italy
- Education: Masaryk University; Pontifical Oriental Institute
- Motto: Ex toto corde
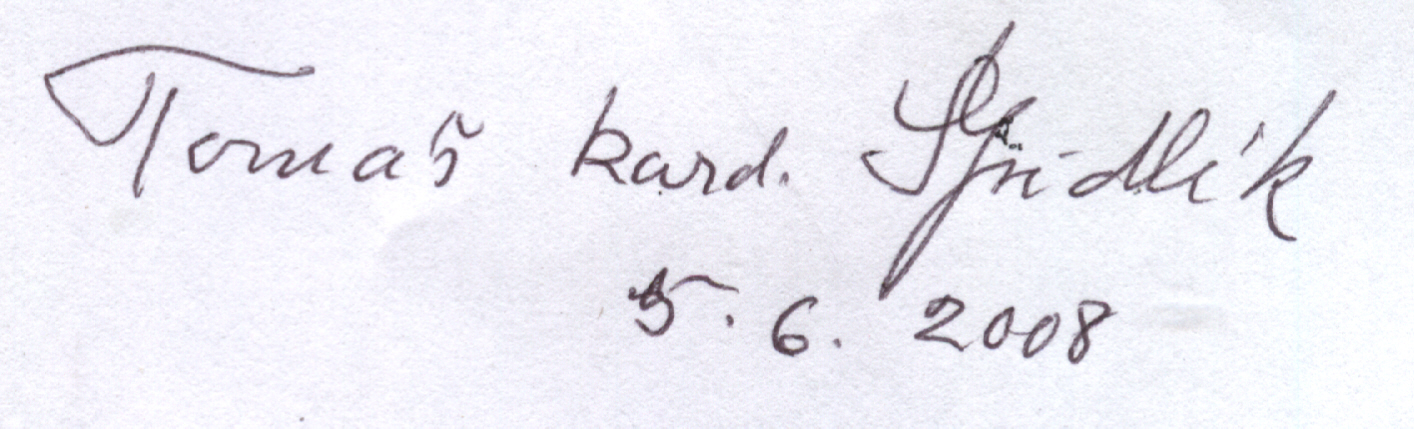
- Signature

- Coat of arms

Styles of Tomáš Špidlík
- Reference style: His Eminence
- Spoken style: Your Eminence
- Informal style: Cardinal
- See: none

Tomáš Josef Špidlík, S.J. (17 December 1919 – 16 April 2010) was a Czech Catholic prelate and theologian. Pope John Paul II made him a cardinal in 2003. He was a member of the Jesuits.

== Biography ==
Špidlík was born in 1919 in Boskovice, then Czechoslovakia, now Czech Republic. In 1938, he entered the Department of Philosophy at the Masaryk University in Brno, in what is now the Czech Republic. In the following year, he entered the Jesuit novitiate and after many interruptions in his education due to World War II, he was ordained a priest of the Society of Jesus on 22 August 1949 in Maastricht. in 1949. A year later, in Florence, he finished his formation period as a Jesuit.

In 1951, Špidlík was called to Rome by Vatican Radio. The programs broadcast to the countries behind the Iron Curtain were a precious aid to a freedom which was in danger of being slowly but inexorably suffocated. From this work with Vatican Radio sprang a special mission that would always accompany him and that made him known in lands despite their communist domination. Among others, he met with Alexander Dubček, the former first secretary of the Central Committee of the Communist Party of Czechoslovakia, and Václav Havel, who became president of Czechoslovakia and the Czech Republic after the fall of the communist regime. Špidlík's Sunday homilies in Czech have been translated and published in various languages including Polish, Romanian and Italian.

He also lectured at the Pontifical Oriental Institute and the Pontifical Gregorian University.

He lived in Rome from 1951 until his death.

In 1995 he delivered the annual Lenten retreat meditations for the pope and officials of the Roman Curia. In June he defended his doctoral dissertation at the Pontifical Oriental Institute in Rome. That year marked the beginning of his university career as a professor of Patristic and Eastern Spiritual Theology at various universities in Rome. Špidlík became known as an expert in the spirituality of Eastern Christianity.

For 38 years he was the spiritual director of the Pontifical Nepomuceno Seminary, the old Bohemian Seminary.

On 21 October 2003, at the age of 83, he was created Cardinal Deacon of the titular church of Sant'Agata dei Goti. Although he was not a voting cardinal, he was created a cardinal in recognition of his theological writings.

The Cardinal was a prolific author and was equally acknowledged in the academic and international fields. He was received at the Kremlin and led the spiritual exercises of Pope John Paul II and his Curia. He was decorated with the medal of the Masaryk Order, one of the highest honors of the Czech State, by president Václav Havel.

In 2005 Špidlík delivered the meditation on the first day of the papal conclave just before the first ballot was taken. Because of age he was not eligible to participate in the voting.

He died in Rome on 16 April 2010.

== Works ==
- La Sophiologie de Saint Basile (1961)
- Visibile Patris Filius: a study of Irenaeus' teaching on revelation and tradition (with Juan Ochagavía) (1964)
- La doctrine spirituelle de Théophane le Reclus: le Cœur et l'Esprit (1965)
- Grégoire de Nazianze: introduction à l'étude de sa doctrine spirituelle (1971)
- L'idée russe: Une autre vision de l'homme (1994)
- Questions monastiques en Orient (1999)
- L'arte dui purificare il cuore (1999)
  - The Art of Purifying the Heart (Convivium, 2010) ISBN 9781934996188
- The Spirituality of the Christian East: A Systematic Handbook (Cistercian Studies) Language: English ISBN 0-87907-979-7 ISBN 978-0879079796
- Prayer: The Spirituality of the Christian East Vol.2 (Liturgical Press, 2005) ISBN 0-87907-706-9 ISBN 978-0879077068
- Drinking from the Hidden Fountain: A Patristic Breviary: Ancient Wisdom for Today's World (Cistercian Studies, No 148) Publisher: Cistercian Publications (June 1994) ISBN 0-87907-348-9 ISBN 978-0879073480
- Geist und Erkenntnis: Zu spirituellen Grundlagen Europas: Festschrift zum 65. Geburtstag von Prof. ThDr. Tomas Spidlik SJ (Integrale Anthropologie) (Minerva Publikation, 1985) ISBN 3-597-10314-6 ISBN 978-3597103149
- Les grands mystiques russes (Nouvelle cité, 1995) ISBN 2-85313-037-1 ISBN 978-2853130370
- Le chemin de l'esprit: Retraite au Vatican (Initiations) (French Edition) (Fates, 1996) ISBN 2-204-05461-5 ISBN 978-2204054614
- Ignazio di Loyola e la spiritualita Orientale: Guida alla lettura degli Esercizi (Religione e societa) (Edizioni Studium, 1994) ISBN 88-382-3693-3 ISBN 978-8838236938
- Zive slovo: Denni evangelium (Czech Edition) Publisher: Refugium Velehrad-Roma; Vyd. 1 edition (1997) Language: Czech ISBN 80-86045-13-7 ISBN 978-8086045139
- Sculptured Prayer: Twelve works of Helen Zelezny interpreted by Thomaso Spidlik. Rome 1968. Language English. Finito di stampare nello Stabilimento di Arti Grafiche Fratelli Palombi in Roma

== See also ==
- Vladimir Lossky
- Pontifical Oriental Institute
