= James France (historian) =

British-Danish art historian (1930–2020)

James France (* 1930 in Brussels – 31 August 2020) was a British-Danish businessman and historian of art and monasticism.

== Business career ==
James France's father was an English producer of design furniture, Charles William Fearnley France (1897–1972); his mother was Renée Mauricette France (1898–1981). The family moved to Denmark in 1936. James studied at Oxford University, graduating with a Master of Arts degree. He entered the family business (for which, among others, Finn Juhl had designed products) in 1957. The firm was sold in 1966, at which point France started a chain of toy stores. He wrote a book about his father's firm, France & Søn, in 2016.

== Historian of the Cistercian Order ==
France returned to scholarship after retiring; his interest in the Cistercian Order had begun at Oxford. He wrote books on the Cistercians in Scandinavia (1992) and monks of the same order in medieval art (1998). He received a doctorate in 2002 from the University of Roskilde, having written a dissertation on The Medieval iconography of St Bernard of Clairvaux c. 1135 - c. 1530. It was published in 2007 as Medieval images of Saint Bernard of Clairvaux. 2012 saw the publication of a book on Cistercian lay brothers. France was made a Fellow of the Society of Antiquaries of London in 1998.

== Publications ==
- The Cistercians in Scandinavia. Cistercian Publications, Kalamazoo, Mich. 1992. (577 pp.) (Cistercian Studies Series 131)
- The Cistercians in Medieval Art. Sutton, London 1998. (278 pp.)
- Medieval Images of Saint Bernard of Clairvaux. Cistercian Publications, Kalamazoo, Mich. 2007. (435 pp.)
- Separate but Equal. Cistercian Lay Brothers, 1120–1350. Liturgical Press, Collegeville, Minn. 2012. (372 pp.)
- France & Søn – British Pioneer of Danish Furniture. Forlaget Vita, Oslo 2016.
- 22 entries in the Literature Database for the Middle Ages
