= Brian Patrick McGuire =

American historian

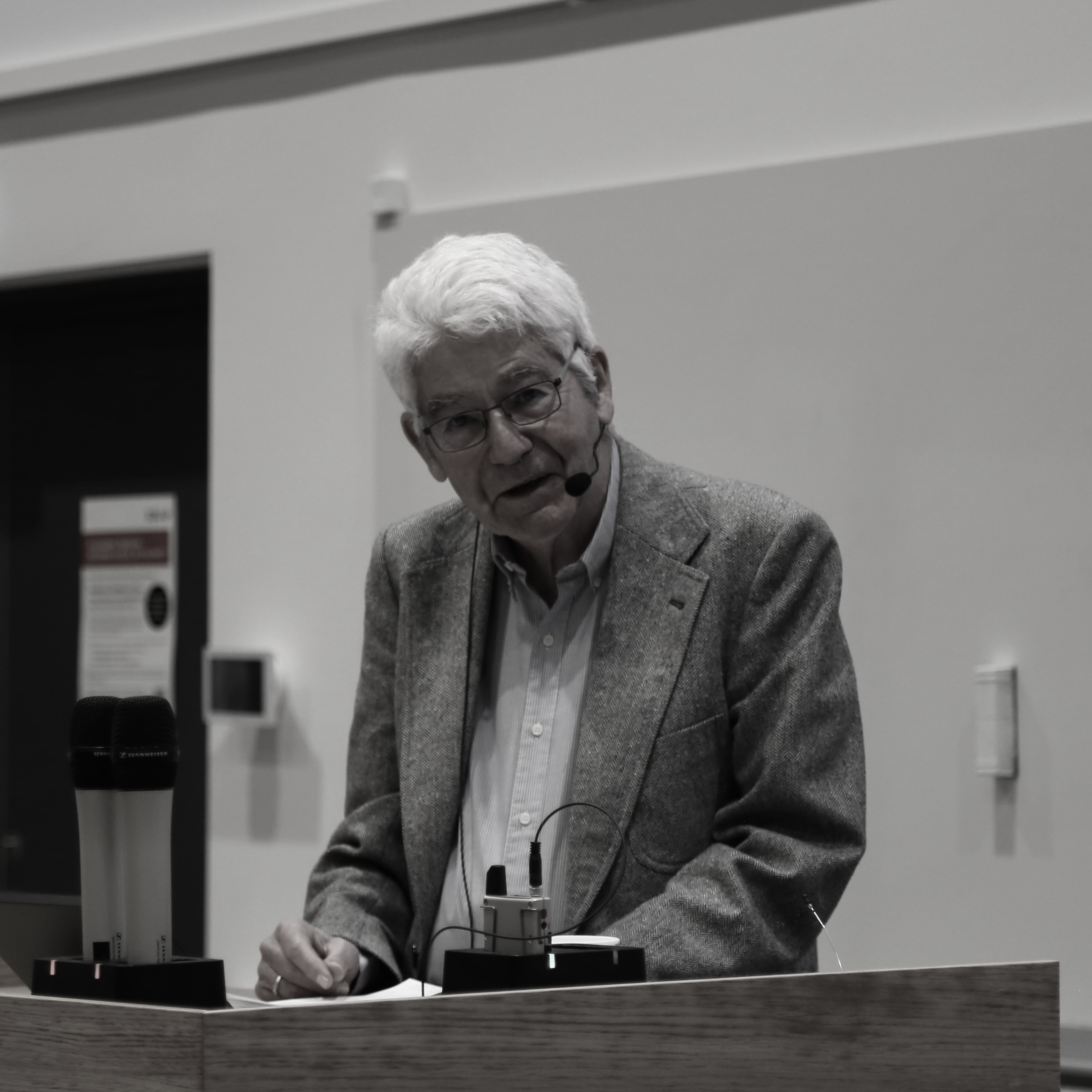
- Historian Brian Patrick McGuire at a symposium in his honour, Odense, 2025
- Born: 2 November 1946 (age 79); Honolulu
- Occupations: Historian, researcher
- Writing career
- Language: English language
- Notable awards: Fulbright Program, Corresponding Fellow of the Medieval Academy of America
- Website: brianmcguire.dk/english-version

Brian Patrick McGuire (born 2 November 1946, in Honolulu, Hawaii) is an American–Danish professor emeritus of history, lecturer and author.

== Family ==
He is the son of sports journalist and publicity director of the San Francisco 49ers, Dan Francis McGuire (1917–83) and high school teacher Phyllis Evelyn Goemmer (1916–2009), the fourth of nine children. He married Ann Kirstin Pedersen (b. 1947) in 1970 and adopted a son from Korea in 1980.

== Education and academic career ==
McGuire obtained a BA in history and Latin from the University of California at Berkeley in 1968; he had the highest grade point average in his graduating class. He became a Fulbright Scholar at Balliol College, Oxford University, England, where he was supervised by Sir Richard Southern and was granted a D.Phil. in history in 1971. In 1970, he was a tutor in "The Great Books of Western Civilisation" at Saint John's College, Annapolis, Maryland.

McGuire emigrated to Denmark in 1971 and worked at first for an electronics firm; from 1971 to 1972 he taught high school. He moved on to the Institute for History at Copenhagen University, where he was a post-doctoral fellow from 1972 to 1974.

McGuire became a Danish citizen in 1976. From 1975 to 1996, he was a lecturer at the Institute for Greek and Latin at Copenhagen University. In 1996 McGuire moved to Roskilde University, where he was a professor in medieval history. He retired in 2012.

McGuire was elected Corresponding Fellow of the Medieval Academy of America in 2011.

== Cistercian Studies ==
McGuire has published widely on the history of the Cistercian Order, focusing on the topics of friendship, storytelling and Cistercian monks in Denmark.

== Grassroots activity ==
Together with his wife Ann Pedersen he founded the Jyderup Refugee Friends in 1985 and from 1986 to 1995 was spokesperson for the National Association of Danish Refugee Friends. In 1987 he received the P.H. Prize (in memory of architect and cultural critic Poul Henningsen) and in 1993 the annual prize of the Legal Politics Association (Retspolitisk Forening).

== Published works ==
He has authored 17 books and edited 8 others.

- Jean Gerson and the Last Medieval Reformation, 2005.
- A Companion to Jean Gerson (editor) 2006.
- Friendship and Community. The Monastic Experience 350–1250, 2010 (new edition with added chapter on recent research).
- A Companion to Bernard of Clairvaux (editor), 2011.
