= Christian martyr =

Person killed for their testimony for or belief in Christianity

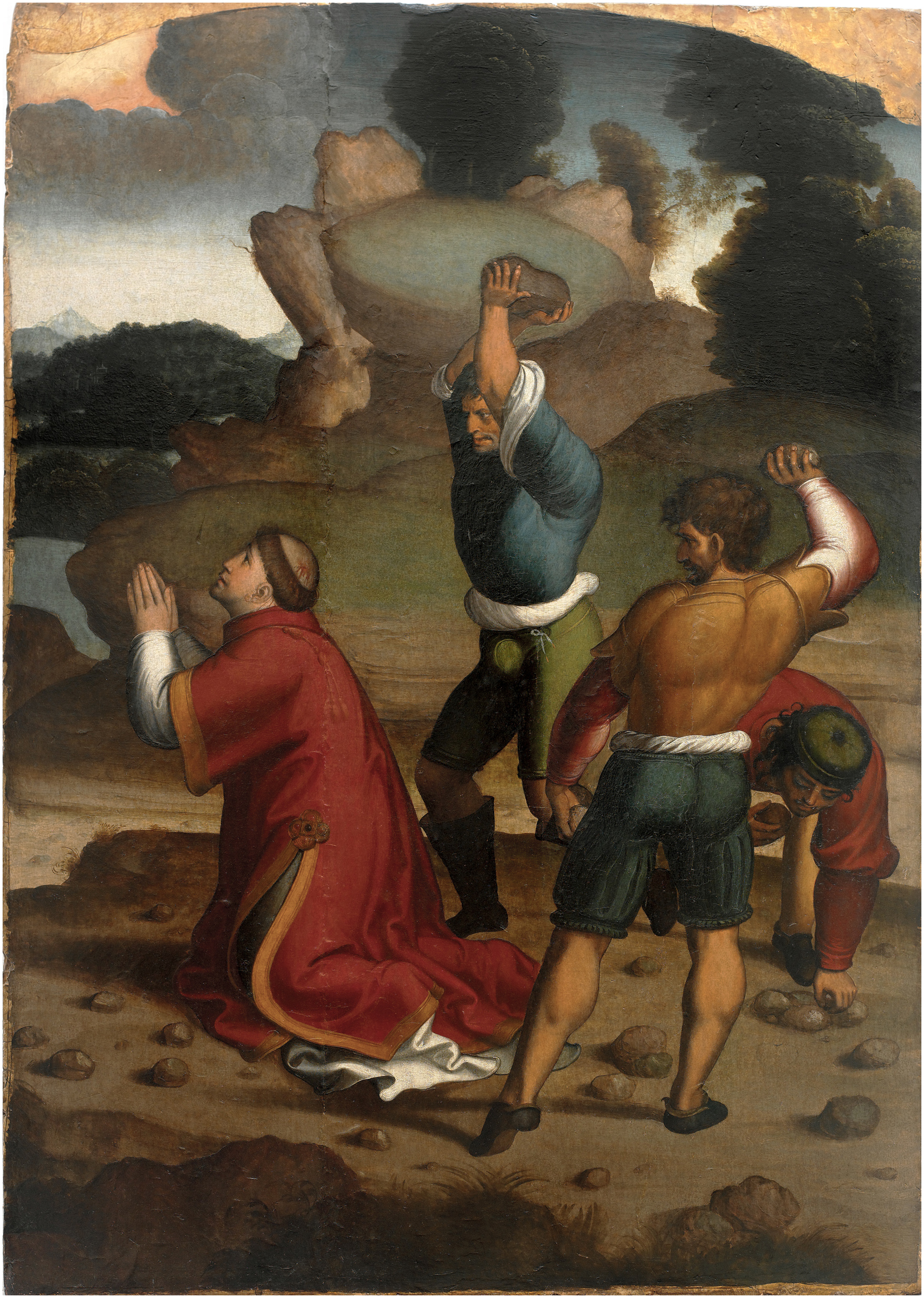
The stoning to death of Stephen, the first Christian martyr, in a painting by the 16th-century Spanish artist Juan Correa de Vivar

In Christianity, a martyr is a person who is murdered for their testimony for Jesus or faith in Jesus. In the years of the early church of Christianity, stories depict this often occurring through death by sawing, stoning, crucifixion, burning at the stake, or other forms of torture and capital punishment. The word martyr comes from the Koine word μάρτυς, mártys, which means "witness" or "testimony".

At first, the term applied to the apostles that followed Jesus Christ. Once Christians started to undergo persecution, the term came to be applied to those who suffered hardships for their faith. Finally, it was restricted to those who had been killed for their faith. The early Christian period before Constantine I was the "Age of Martyrs". Early Christians venerated martyrs as powerful intercessors, and their utterances were treasured as inspired by the Holy Spirit.

In western Christian art, martyrs are often shown holding a palm frond as an attribute, representing the victory of spirit over flesh, and it was widely believed that a picture of a palm on a tomb meant that a martyr was buried there.

== Etymology ==
The use of the word μάρτυς (mártys) in non-biblical Greek was primarily in a legal context. It was used for a person who speaks from personal observation. The martyr, when used in a non-legal context, may also signify a proclamation that the speaker believes to be truthful. The term was used by Aristotle for observations, but also for ethical judgments and expressions of moral conviction that can not be empirically observed. There are several examples where Plato uses the term to signify "witness to truth", including in Laws.

== Background ==
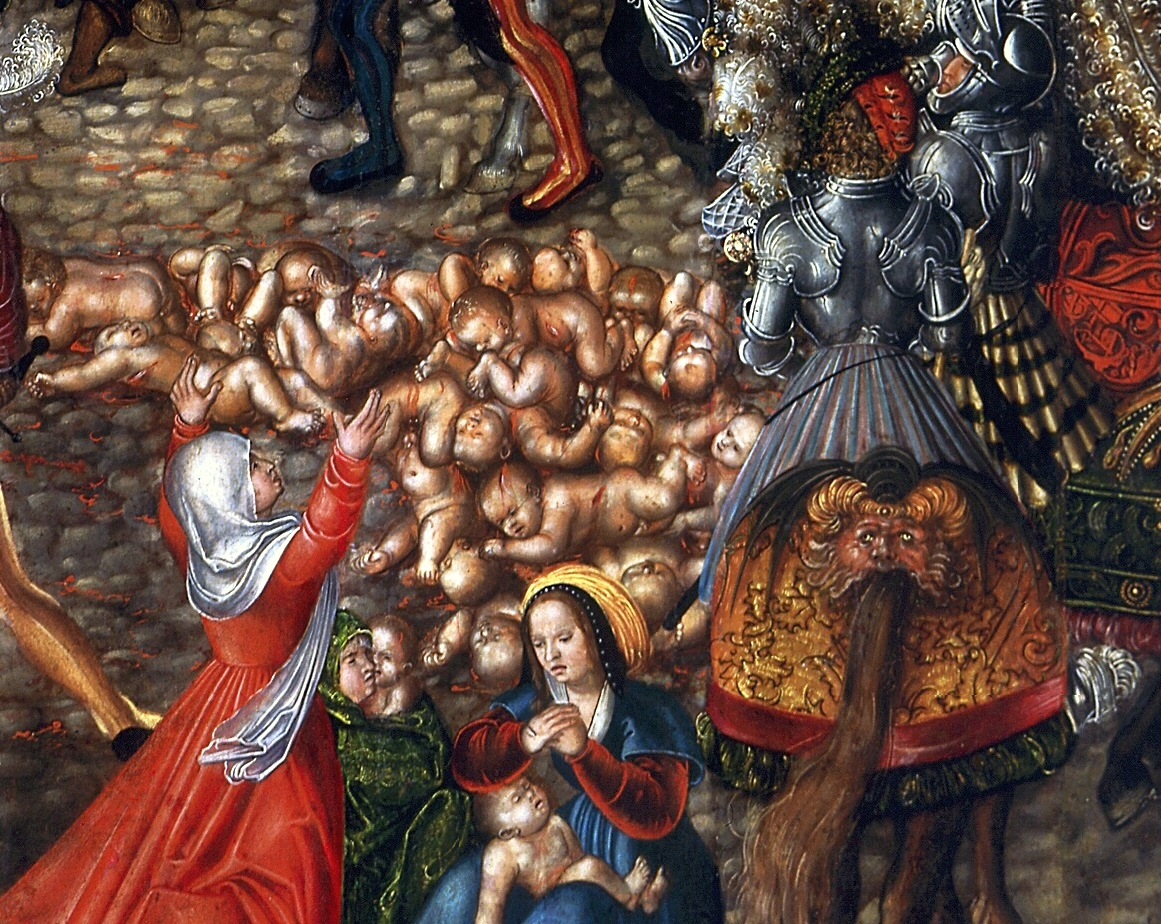
The Massacre of the Innocents (detail) by Lucas Cranach the Elder (c. 1515), National Museum in Warsaw

The Greek word martyr signifies a "witness" who testifies to a fact he has knowledge about from personal observation. It is in this sense that the term first appears in the Book of Acts, in reference to the Apostles as "witnesses" of all that they had observed in the public life of Christ. In Acts 1:22, Peter, in his address to the Apostles and disciples regarding the election of a successor to Judas, employs the term with this meaning: "Wherefore, of these men who have accompanied with us all the time that the Lord Jesus came in and went out among us, beginning from the baptism of John until the day he was taken up from us, one of these must be made a witness with us of his resurrection".

The Apostles, according to tradition, faced grave dangers until eventually almost all suffered death for their convictions. The Bible reports the martyrdom of two of the apostles. Thus, within the lifetime of the Apostles, the term martyrs came to be used in the sense of a witness who at any time might be called upon to deny what he testified to, under penalty of death. From this stage the transition was easy to the ordinary meaning of the term, as used ever since in Christian literature: a martyr, or witness of Christ, is a person who suffers death rather than deny his faith. Saint John, at the end of the first century, employs the word with this meaning. A distinction between martyrs and confessors is traceable to the latter part of the second century: those only were martyrs who had suffered the extreme penalty, whereas the title of confessor was given to Christians who had shown their willingness to die for their belief, by bravely enduring imprisonment or torture, but were not put to death. Yet the term martyr was still sometimes applied during the third century to persons still living, as, for instance, by Cyprian who gave the title of martyrs to a number of bishops, priests, and laymen condemned to penal servitude in the mines.

== Origins ==
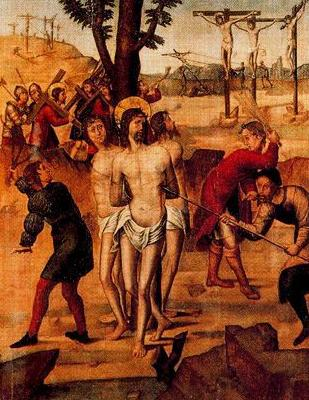
The Martyrdom of San Acacio (Acacius, Agathus, Agathius). From Triptych. Museo del Prado

Religious martyrdom is considered one of the more significant contributions of Second Temple Judaism to western civilization. It is believed that the concept of voluntary death for God developed out of the conflict between King Antiochus Epiphanes IV and the Jewish people. 1 Maccabees and 2 Maccabees recount numerous martyrdoms suffered by Jews resisting the Hellenizing of their Seleucid overlords, being executed for such crimes as observing the Sabbath, circumcising their children, or refusing to eat pork or meat sacrificed to foreign gods. With few exceptions, this assumption has lasted from the early Christian period to this day, accepted both by Jews and Christians.

According to Daniel Boyarin, there are "two major theses with regard to the origins of Christian martyrology, which [can be referred to] as the Frend thesis and the Bowersock thesis". Boyarin characterizes W. H. C. Frend's view of martyrdom as having originated in Judaism and Christian martyrdom as a continuation of that practice. Frend argues that the Christian concept of martyrdom can only be understood as springing from Jewish roots. Frend characterizes Judaism as "a religion of martyrdom" and that it was this "Jewish psychology of martyrdom" that inspired Christian martyrdom. Frend writes, "In the first two centuries AD. there was a living pagan tradition of self-sacrifice for a cause, a preparedness if necessary to defy an unjust ruler, that existed alongside the developing Christian concept of martyrdom inherited from Judaism."

In contrast to Frend's hypothesis, Boyarin describes G. W. Bowersock's view of Christian martyrology as being completely unrelated to the Jewish practice, being instead "a practice that grew up in an entirely Roman cultural environment and then was borrowed by Jews". Bowersock argues that the Christian tradition of martyrdom came from the urban culture of the Roman Empire, especially in Asia Minor:

Martyrdom was ... solidly anchored in the civic life of the Graeco-Roman world of the Roman empire. It ran its course in the great urban spaces of the agora and the amphitheater, the principal settings for public discourse and for public spectacle. It depended upon the urban rituals of the imperial cult and the interrogation protocols of local and provincial magistrates. The prisons and brothels of the cities gave further opportunities for the display of the martyr's faith.

Boyarin points out that, despite their apparent opposition to each other, both of these arguments are based on the assumption that Judaism and Christianity were already two separate and distinct religions. He challenges that assumption and argues that "making of martyrdom was at least in part, part and parcel of the process of the making of Judaism and Christianity as distinct entities".

== Jesus, King of Martyrs ==
The Apostle Paul taught that Jesus was "obedient unto death," a 1st century Jewish phrasing for self-sacrifice in Jewish law. Because of this, some scholars believe Jesus' death was Jewish martyrdom. Jesus himself said he had come to fulfill the Torah. The Catholic Church calls Jesus the "King of Martyrs" because, as a man, he refused to commit sin unto the point of shedding blood.

== Theology ==
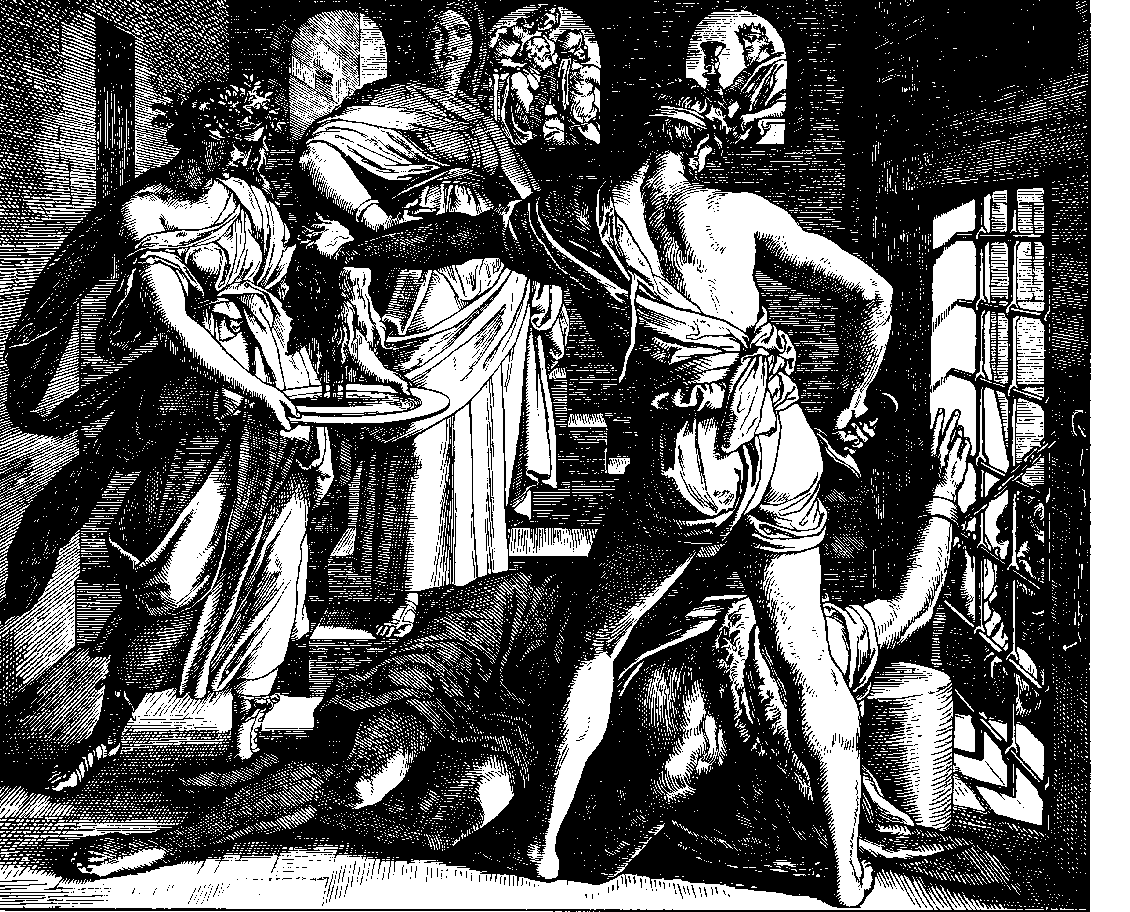
Beheading of John the Baptist by Julius Schnorr von Karolsfeld, 1860

Tertullian, one of the 2nd-century ecclesiastical writers wrote that "the blood of martyrs is the seed of the Church", implying that a martyr's willing sacrifice of their lives leads to the conversion of others.

The Age of Martyrs also forced the church to confront theological issues such as the proper response to those Christians who "lapsed" and renounced the Christian faith to save their lives: were they to be allowed back into the Church? Some felt they should not, while others said they could. In the end, it was agreed to allow them in after a period of penance. The re-admittance of the "lapsed" became a defining moment in the Church because it allowed the sacrament of repentance and readmission to the Church despite issues of sin. This issue caused the Donatist and Novatianist schisms.

"Martyrdom for the faith ... became a central feature in the Christian experience". "Notions of persecution by the 'world', ... run deep in the Christian tradition. For evangelicals who read the New Testament as an inerrant history of the primitive church, the understanding that to be a Christian is to be persecuted is obvious, if not inescapable."

The "eschatological ideology" of martyrdom was based on an irony found in the Pauline epistles: "to live outside of Christ is to die, and to die in Christ is to live." In Ad Martyras, Tertullian writes that some Christians "eagerly desired it" (et ultro appetita) [i.e. martyrdom].

The martyr homilies were written in ancient Greek by authors such as Basil of Caesarea, Gregory of Nyssa, Asterius of Amasea, John Chrysostom, and Hesychius of Jerusalem. These homilies were part of the hagiographical tradition of saints and martyrs.

This experience, and the associated martyrs and apologists, would have significant historical and theological consequences for the developing faith.

Among other things, persecution sparked the devotion of the saints, facilitated the rapid growth and spread of Christianity, prompted defenses and explanations of Christianity (the "apologies") and, in its aftermath, raised fundamental questions about the nature of the Church.

== The Early Church ==
Stephen is the first martyr reported in the New Testament, accused of blasphemy and stoned by the Sanhedrin under the Levitical law. Toward the end of the 1st century, the martyrdom of both Peter and Paul is reported by Clement of Rome in 1 Clement. The martyrdom of Peter is also alluded to in various writings written between 70 and 130 AD, including in John 21:19; 1 Peter 5:1; and 2 Peter 1:12–15. The martyrdom of Paul is also alluded to in 2 Timothy 4:6–7. While not specifying his Christianity as involved in the cause of death, the Jewish historian Josephus reports that James, whom he referred to as a brother of Jesus, was stoned by Jewish authorities under the charge of law breaking, which is similar to the Christian perception of Stephen's martyrdom as being a result of stoning for the penalty of law breaking. Furthermore, there is a report regarding the martyrdom of James son of Zebedee in Acts 12:1–2, and knowledge that both John and James, son of Zebedee, ended up martyred, appears to be reflected in Mark 10:39.

Judith Perkins has written that many ancient Christians believed that "to be a Christian was to suffer," partly inspired by the example of Jesus. The lives of the martyrs became a source of inspiration for some Christians, and their relics were honored. Numerous crypts and chapels in the Roman catacombs bear witness to the early veneration for those champions of freedom of conscience. Special commemoration services, at which the holy Sacrifice were offered over their tombs gave rise to the time honoured custom of consecrating altars by enclosing in them the relics of martyrs.

== The Roman Empire ==
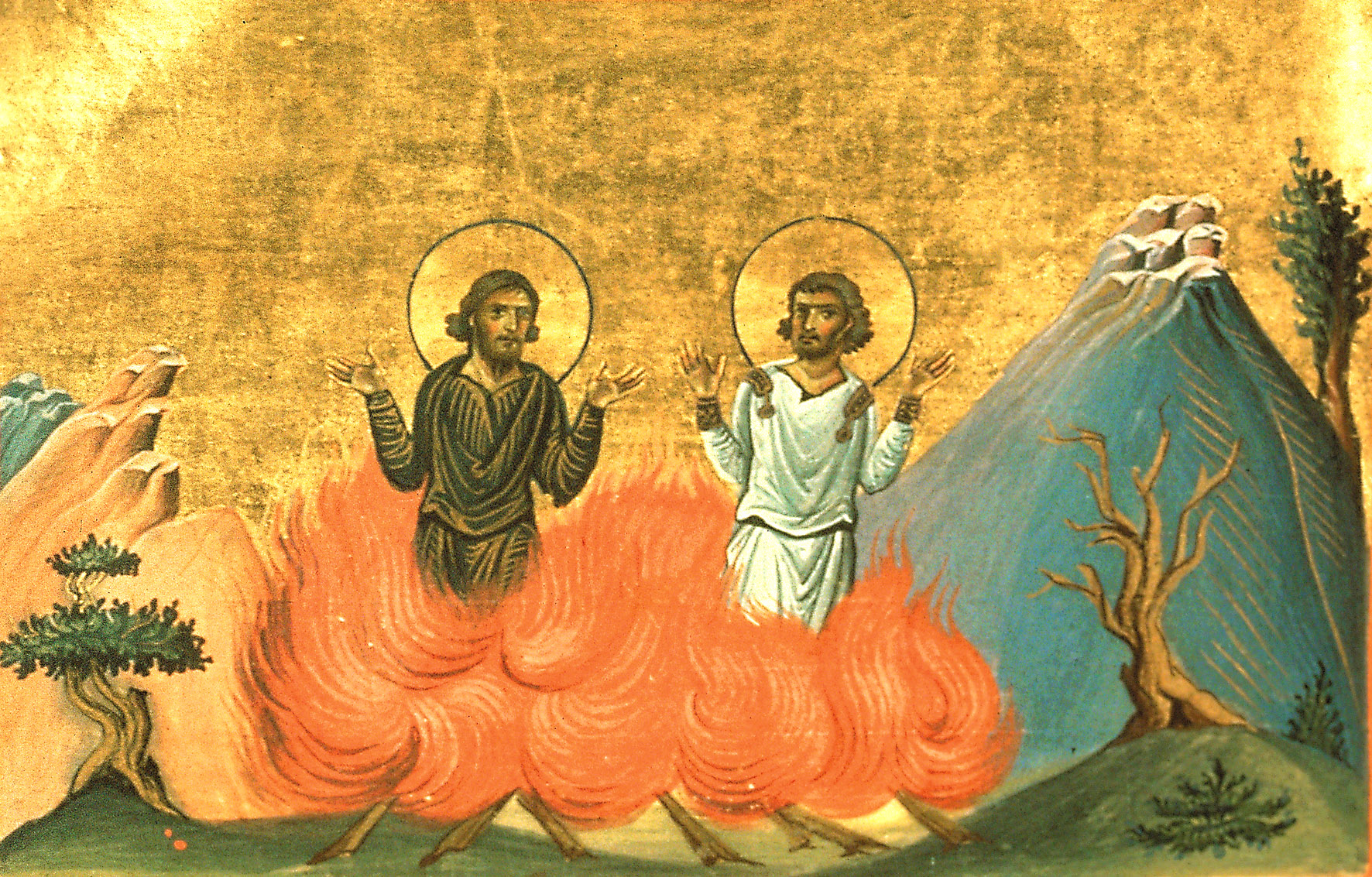
The martyrs Maximus and Theodotus of Adrianopolis, c. 985

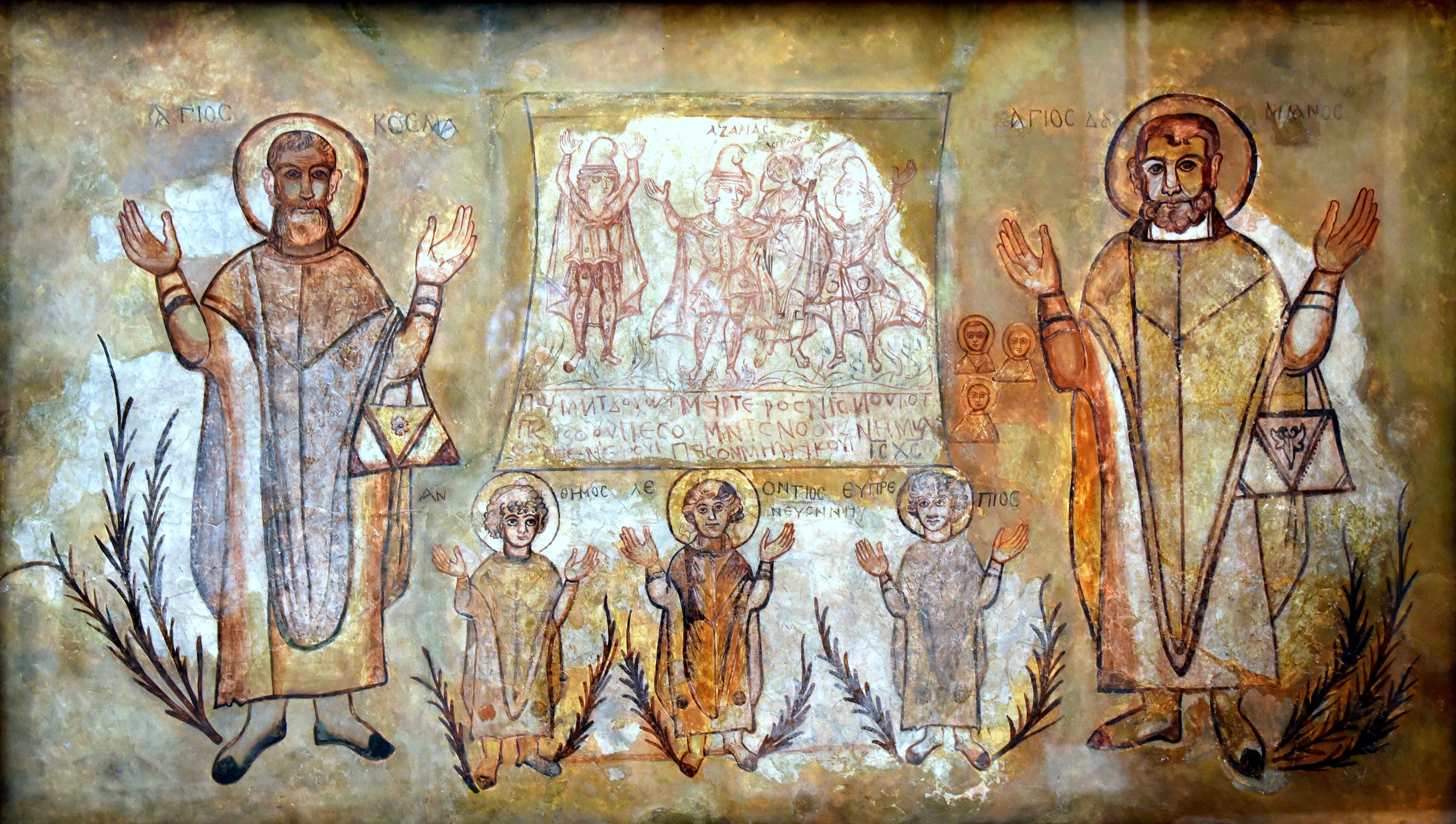
Wall painting of the martyred saints Ananias, Azarias, and Misael from the town of Samalut with Saints Damian and Cosmas, martyred during the persecutions of Diocletian in the late 3rd century AD. Stucco. 6th century AD. From Wadi Sarga, Egypt. British Museum.

In its first three centuries, the Christian church endured periods of persecution at the hands of Roman authorities. Christians were persecuted by local authorities on an intermittent and ad hoc basis. In addition, there were several periods of empire-wide persecution which were directed from the seat of government in Rome.

Christians were the targets of persecution because they refused to worship the Roman gods or to pay homage to the emperor as divine. In the Roman Empire, refusing to sacrifice to the Emperor or the empire's gods was tantamount to refusing to swear an oath of allegiance to one's country. However, some scholars, such as Morton Smith, point out that other sects, such as the Jews and Samaritans, also refused to worship other gods, but were not generally persecuted. Smith points out that the early Christians (in the 100's to the 200's) were accused of practicing magic and other crimes associated with magic, and that magic has been commonly neglected in discussions of the persecutions. Jacob Burkhardt writes that the reason for the persecution of Christians under Diocletian around 300 may have been that after a period of growth and expansion Christians sought to gain control of the imperial office.

The cult of the saints was significant to the process of Christianization, but during the first centuries of the Church the celebrations venerating the saints took place in hiding. Michael Gaddis writes that "[t]he Christian experience of violence during the pagan persecutions shaped the ideologies and practices that drove further religious conflicts over the course of the fourth and fifth centuries". Martyrdom was a formative experience and influenced how Christians justified or condemned the use of violence in later generations. Thus, the collective memory of religious suffering found in early Christian works on the historical experience of persecution, religious suffering and martyrdom shaped Christian culture and identity.

== The Middle Ages ==
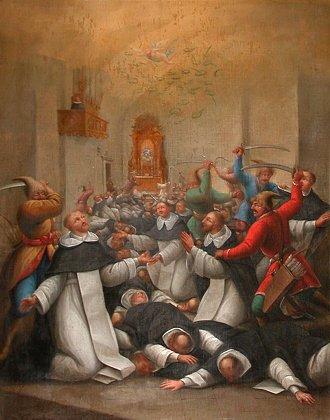
Dominican martyrs killed by Mongols during the Mongol invasion of Poland in 1260

Historians recognize that during the Early Middle Ages, the Christian populations living in the lands invaded by the Arab Muslim armies between the 7th and 10th centuries AD suffered religious discrimination, religious persecution, religious violence, and martyrdom multiple times at the hands of Arab Muslim officials and rulers. As People of the Book, Christians under Muslim rule were subjected to dhimmi status (along with Jews, Samaritans, Gnostics, Mandeans, and Zoroastrians), which was inferior to the status of Muslims. Christians and other religious minorities thus faced religious discrimination and religious persecution, in that they were banned from proselytising (for Christians, it was forbidden to evangelize or spread Christianity) in the lands invaded by the Arab Muslims on pain of death; they were banned from bearing arms, undertaking certain professions, and were obligated to dress differently in order to distinguish themselves from Arabs.

Under sharia, non-Muslims were obligated to pay jizya and kharaj taxes, together with periodic heavy ransom levied upon Christian communities by Muslim rulers in order to fund military campaigns, all of which contributed a significant proportion of income to the Islamic states while conversely reducing many Christians to poverty, and these financial and social hardships forced many Christians to convert to Islam. Christians unable to pay these taxes were forced to surrender their children to the Muslim rulers as payment who would sell them as slaves to Muslim households where they were forced to convert to Islam. Many Christian martyrs were executed under the Islamic death penalty for defending their Christian faith through dramatic acts of resistance such as refusing to convert to Islam, repudiation of the Islamic religion and subsequent reconversion to Christianity, and blasphemy toward Muslim beliefs.

In Dives and Pauper, a 15th-century Middle English moral treatise on the Ten Commandments, the figure Dives poses this question about the First Commandment: "Why are there no martyrs these days, as there used to be?" Pauper responds that the English were creating many new martyrs sparing "neither their own king nor their own bishops, no dignity, no rank, no status, no degree". Pauper's statement is based on historical events, including the murder of King Richard II and the executions of Richard Scrope, Archbishop of York. Dana Piroyansky uses the term "political martyrs" for men of "high estate", including kings and bishops, who were killed during the Late Middle Ages during the course of the rebellions, civil wars, regime changes, and other political upheavals of the 14th and 15th centuries. Piroyansky notes that although these men were never formally canonized as saints, they were venerated as miracle-working martyrs and their tombs were turned into shrines following their violent and untimely deaths. J. C. Russell has written that the "cults of political saints" may have been a way of "showing resistance to the king" that would have been difficult to control or punish.

== Degrees of martyrdom ==
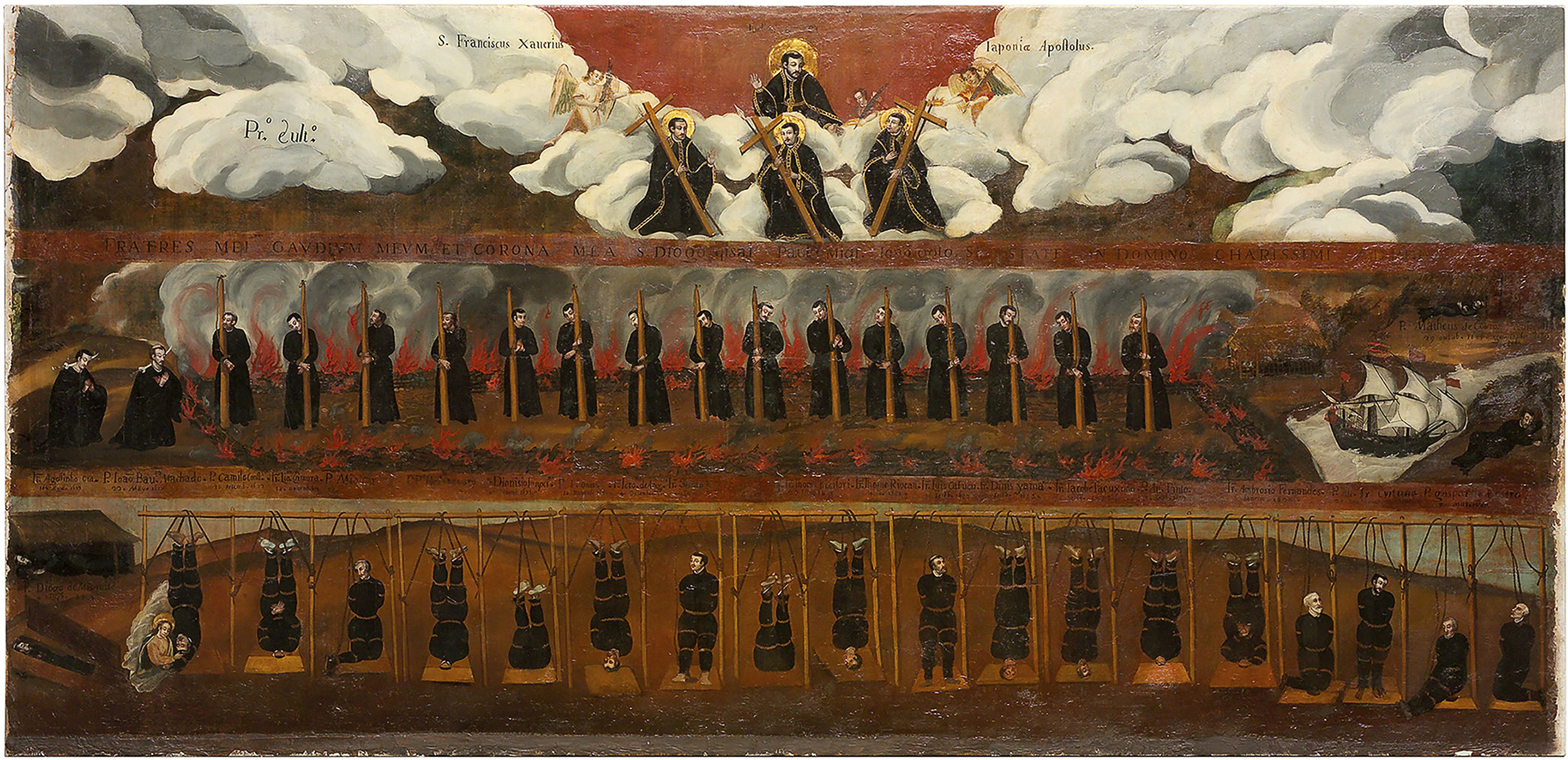
Martyrdom of Paul Miki, Philip of Jesus, Gonsalo Garcia, and other Japanese Christians and foreign missionaries in Nagasaki, 1597

Some Roman Catholic writers (such as Thomas Cahill) continue to use a system of degrees of martyrdom that was developed in early Christianity. Some of these degrees bestow the title of martyr on those who sacrifice large elements of their lives alongside those who sacrifice life itself. These degrees were mentioned by Pope Gregory I in Homilia in Evangelia; in it he wrote of "three modes of martyrdom, designated by the colors, red, blue (or green), and white". A believer was bestowed the title of red martyr due to either torture or violent death by religious persecution. The term "white martyrdom" was used by the Church Father Jerome, "for those such as desert hermits who aspired to the condition of martyrdom through strict asceticism". Blue (or green) martyrdom "involves the denial of desires, as through fasting and penitent labors without necessarily implying a journey or complete withdrawal from life".

Also along these lines are the terms "wet martyr" (a person who has shed blood or been executed for the faith) and "dry martyr" (a person who "had suffered every indignity and cruelty" but not shed blood, nor suffered execution).

The term Confessor of the Faith is used for those who for example die in custody, but are not executed.

== Christian martyrs today ==
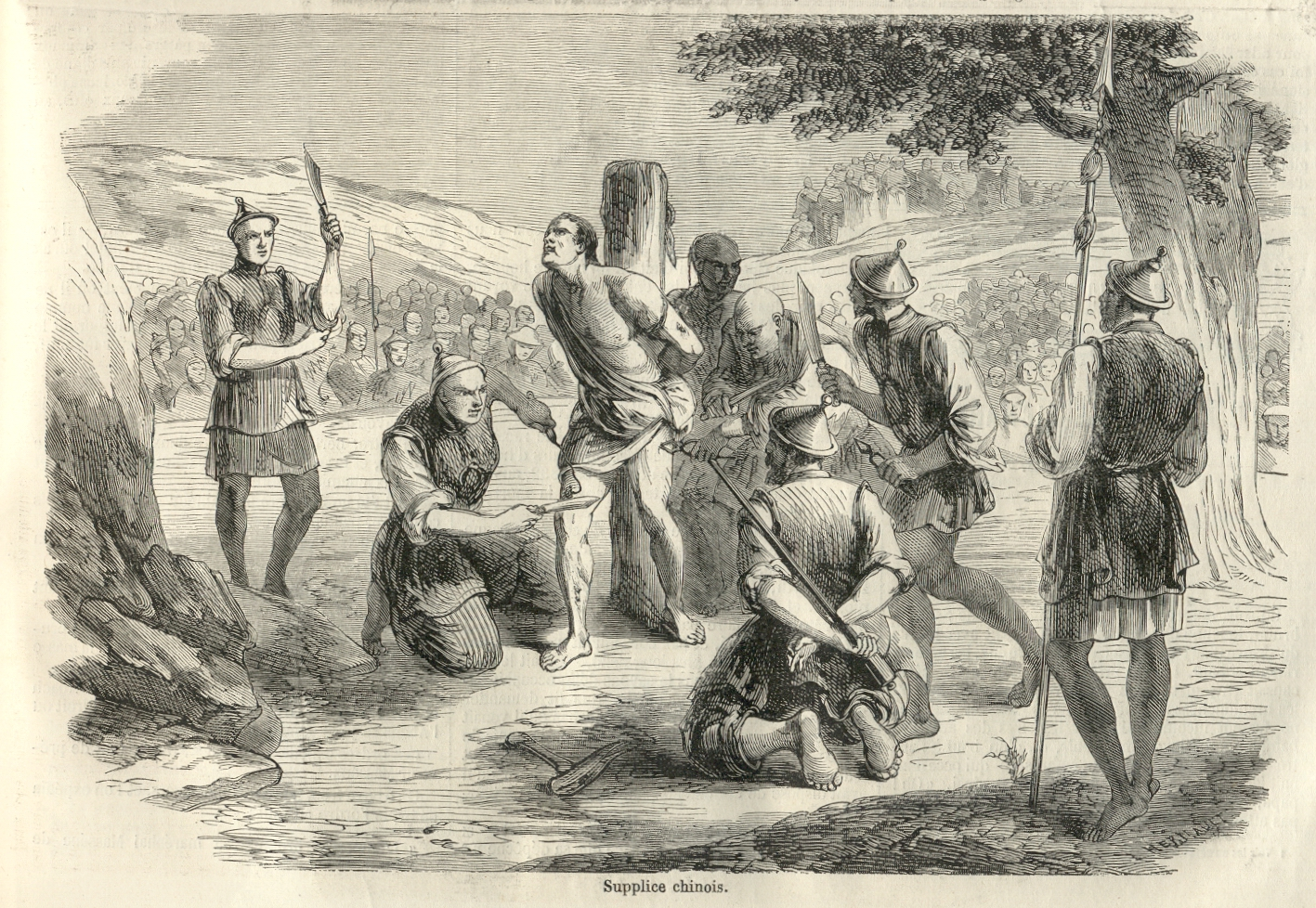
An 1858 illustration from the French newspaper, Le Monde Illustré, of the torture and execution of a French missionary in China by slow slicing

The Center for the Study of Global Christianity of Gordon–Conwell Theological Seminary, an evangelical seminary based in Hamilton, Massachusetts, previously estimated that 100,000 Christians die annually for their faith, although the CSGC has now disavowed this estimate. Archbishop Silvano Maria Tomasi, permanent observer of the Holy See to the United Nations, later referred to this number in a radio address to the 23rd session of the Human Rights Council.

The methodology used in arriving at the estimate of 100,000 has been widely criticized. The majority of the one million people the Center counted as Christians who died as martyrs between 2000 and 2010 died during the Civil War in the Democratic Republic of Congo, and the report did not take into consideration the political or ethnic differences which are accepted as the primary motive behind these killings. Todd Johnson, director of the CSGC, says his centre has abandoned this statistic. The Vatican reporter and author of The Global War on Christians John L. Allen Jr. said: "I think it would be good to have reliable figures on this issue, but I don't think it ultimately matters in terms of the point of my book, which is to break through the narrative that tends to dominate discussion in the West – that Christians can't be persecuted because they belong to the world's most powerful church. The truth is two-thirds of the 2.3 billion Christians in the world today live... in dangerous neighbourhoods. They are often poor. They often belong to ethnic, linguistic, and cultural minorities. And they are often at risk."

=== Catholic martyrs of the 20th century ===
Writing for the Catholic Herald, Robert Royal, president of the Faith and Reason Institute, reported about the results of his research which appeared in his book The Catholic Martyrs of the Twentieth Century: A Comprehensive Global History.

== See also ==
- Baptism of blood
- Catacombs of Rome
- Great martyr
- List of Christian martyrs
- List of protomartyrs
- New Martyr
- Persecution of Christians in the Roman Empire
- Persecution of Christians
- Virgin martyrs

== Sources ==
- York, Tripp (2007). The Purple Crown: The politics of martyrdom. Herald Press. ISBN 978-0-8361-9393-0.
- Whitfield, Joshua J. (2009). Pilgrim Holiness: Martyrdom as descriptive witness. Cascade. ISBN 978-1-60608-175-4.
- Wade, Rick (27 May 1999). "Persecution in the early church". Probe.org. Archived from the original on 9 October 2004.
- Foxe, John (1563). Forbush, William Byron (ed.). Foxe's Book of Martyrs. London, UK: John Day. OCLC 751705715.
- Keane, Paul (2009). The Martyr's Crown. Family Publications. ISBN 978-1907380006.
- Jesus Freaks: D.C. Talk and the voice of the martyrs — stories of those who stood for Jesus. D.C. Talk (organization). Bethany House Publishers. 2014. ISBN 978-0764212024.
