= Peter V. Sampo =

American college president (1931–2020)

Peter V. Sampo (1931– May 27, 2020) was an educator and college president, who founded three colleges, two of which have since closed. He founded Magdalen College (1974–2024), Cardinal Newman College (1974–1985), as well as Thomas More College of Liberal Arts in 1978.

At least two of the colleges, of which he also served as the first president, were Catholic liberal arts colleges with curricula built on Great Books of Western culture.

== Life and career ==
Peter V. Sampo made his undergraduate studies at Saint Vincent College in Pennsylvania and earned a Ph.D. in political science at the University of Notre Dame in Indiana.

Sampo taught at St. Anselm College from 1962 to 1970.

In 1974, Sampo, together with former high-school teacher John Meehan and businessman Francis Boucher, founded Magdalen College in Bedford, New Hampshire. Sampo was president of Magdalen from 1974 until 1977.

In 1977, he left to start Cardinal Newman College in Missouri, which closed for financial reasons in 1985.

He then began work on Thomas More College of Liberal Arts in Merrimack, New Hampshire, offering a four-year liberal arts curriculum inspired by educators Donald and Louise Cowan. He served as president of Thomas More until 2006.

In 2009 he founded the Erasmus Institute of Liberal Arts, a liberal arts school in Canterbury, New Hampshire offering the Cowan curriculum formerly used at Thomas More College. In 2011, its students joined Magdalen College of the Liberal Arts along with Sampo and other faculty when the college agreed to offer the Cowan curriculum.

He died on May 27, 2020, after receiving last rites from the Magdalen College chaplain.

== Honors ==
In 2007 the New England Board of Higher Education gave Sampo its "Higher Education Excellence" award.

The CiRCE Institute for classical education designated Sampo the 2008 winner of its Paideia Prize.
