= Magdalen College of the Liberal Arts =

Catholic college in Warner, New Hampshire, United States

Coordinates: 43°18′49″N 71°50′1″W

- Former names: Northeast Catholic College, Magdalen College; The College of Saint Mary Magdalen
- Motto: Duc In Altum
- Motto in English: Set out into the deep
- Type: Private liberal arts college
- Active: 1973–2024
- Religious affiliation: Catholic Church
- President: Ryan Messmore
- Students: 58
- Undergraduates: 58
- Location: Warner, New Hampshire, United States
- Campus: 135 acres (55 ha); Rural
- Colors: Blue, yellow, white
- Nickname: Magdalen
- Website: magdalen.edu

Magdalen College of the Liberal Arts (formerly Northeast Catholic College, The College of Saint Mary Magdalen, and simply Magdalen College) was a private Catholic liberal arts college in Warner, New Hampshire, United States. The college opened in 1973. Enrollment never exceeded 90 students and it closed in May 2024.

It was recognized as a Catholic college by the Diocese of Manchester and recommended by the Cardinal Newman Society. Magdalen College offered associate and bachelor's degrees in liberal studies with majors in philosophy, theology, history, and literature as well as a multi-disciplinary major in the great books. Its curriculum was based on the study of the great books throughout its curriculum both in its core and in its majors. Magdalen College possessed degree-granting authority from the State of New Hampshire and was regionally accredited by the New England Association of Schools and Colleges.

Magdalen College was founded by Catholic laymen in 1973. From 1974 to 1991 the college operated at its original campus in Bedford, New Hampshire; in 1991, it moved to its last site in Warner.

== History ==
=== Magdalen College (1973–2010) ===
Catholic laymen Francis Boucher, John Meehan and Peter Sampo founded "Magdalen College" in 1973, responding to the Second Vatican Council's call for the education of lay Catholic leaders, and with the encouragement of the Bishop of Manchester, Ernest John Primeau. The college was chartered by the State of New Hampshire August 22, 1973, and enrolled its first students in September 1974. The first class consisted of sixteen students and their first day of classes was Friday, September 6, 1974. The initial staff consisted of two professors, and three assistants teaching Latin, Philosophy, Mathematics, Science, and Music.

From 1974 to 1991, the college operated at its original campus, a former motel building in Bedford, New Hampshire. In 1979, there were 70 students and 20 alumni.

Under the presidency of co-founder John Meehan, the college followed a policy of standing in loco parentis and closely supervised students' dress, manners, and behavior in order to maintain a moral atmosphere.

==== Move to Warner campus ====
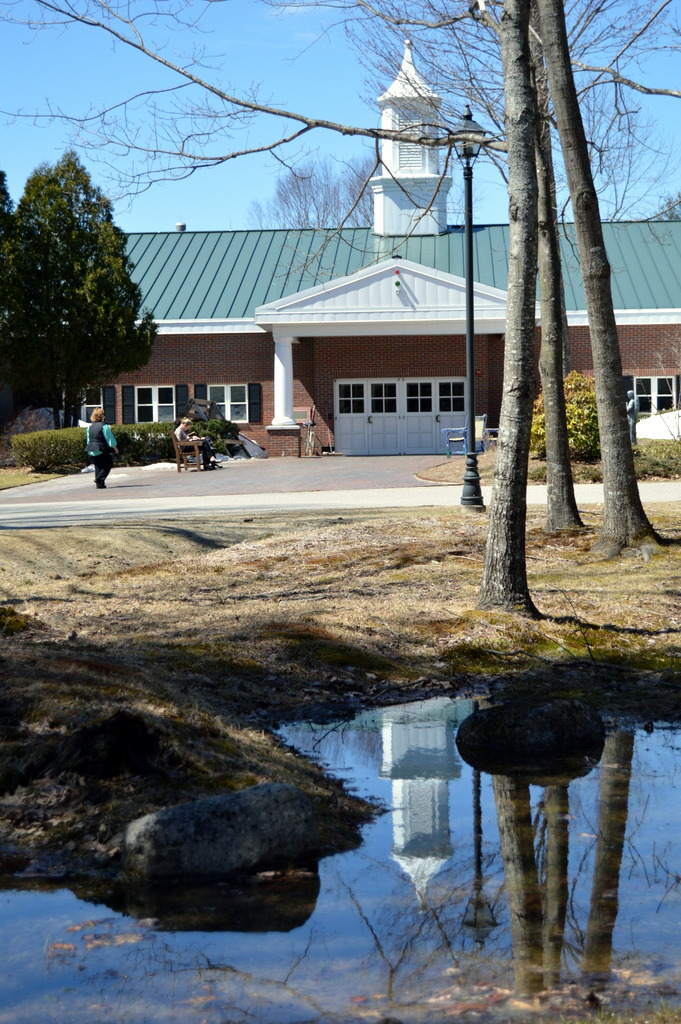
St. Paul's Multipurpose Building at Magdalen College in Warner, NH

In 1988, there were 39 students. New Hampshire state education officials questioned the college's financial stability. A benefactor's support enabled the college to continue operation. Within three years, Magdalen College had purchased and developed a new campus property. The college relocated to its last site in Warner, New Hampshire, in 1991.

==== Outreach and re-founding ====
From 2007 to 2011, the college owned the Durward's Glen retreat house in Baraboo, Wisconsin, formerly a novitiate for the Order of St. Camillus, and operated it as a site for retreats, religious events, and educational programs.

From 2008 to 2010, Magdalen College discussed a merger or "unification" with Thomas More College of Liberal Arts in Merrimack, New Hampshire, but it was cancelled. During the same period, the college underwent a process of reform to shed its image of severity; the student handbook was revised.

=== The College of Saint Mary Magdalen (2010–2015) ===
In October 2010, the college was renamed "The College of Saint Mary Magdalen." It modified its curriculum to include studies of ancient Rome, the Middle Ages, the Renaissance, and post-Modern culture, and a four-year cycle of music and art courses.

In 2011, the students and faculty of the Erasmus Institute of Liberal Arts, founded by Magdalen's first president Peter V. Sampo, joined the college, bringing with them the institute's four-year liberal arts curriculum inspired by educators Donald and Louise Cowan. However, by the end of the first semester of having two programs, the great books and the Cowan, it became clear that the dual program approach "would not work." The curriculum merger led to the introduction of concentrations and the optional study of Greek into the great books program.

=== Northeast Catholic College (2015–2019) ===
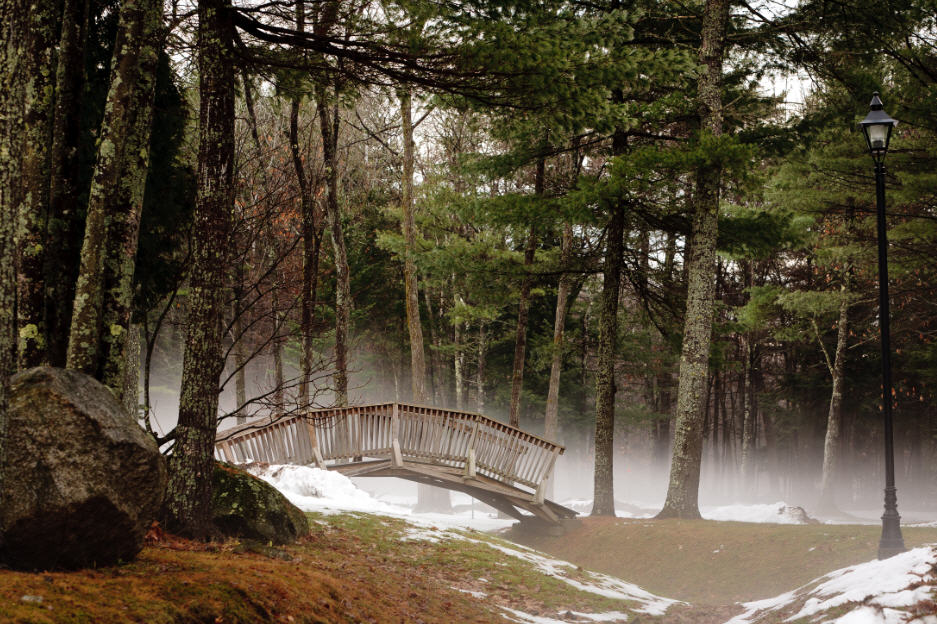
Arched bridge on the Warner campus of Magdalen College

In January 2015, the college adopted the name "Northeast Catholic College." Coincident with the renaming, the college announced five majors—great books, theology, philosophy, literature, and politics—a new Career Pathways Program, and new co-patronage under Pope John Paul II. As of 2015, enrollment was reported to be 61 students. The religious makeup of the student body was reported to be 95% Catholic. In January 2016, Northeast Catholic College became the first college in the nation to adopt the Classic Learning Test (CLT) as an alternative to the SAT and ACT.

Following the college's hosting of a Napa Institute seminar in New York City in 2014, the college was invited to offer another seminar in July 2015 at the Napa Institute in California. Senior faculty of the college were also invited to lead seminars as part of retreat organized by the journal First Things in New York City. The college continued to lead First Things intellectual retreats in New York from 2016 to 2019.

In the fall of 2018, the college added a semester abroad that integrated study in Rome, Kraków, and Norcia as well as a summer program of studies in Oxford. The college integrated a cyclic and team-taught approach to the humanities consisting of 48 credits that united the college in a single program of reading across four years. That year the college also added Anthony Esolen to its faculty.

=== Magdalen College of the Liberal Arts (2019–2024) ===
On August 12, 2019, it was announced that, in anticipation of the college's 50th anniversary in 2023, the trustees had elected to again take up its founding name, Magdalen College, together with the addendum "of the Liberal Arts".

On June 22, 2020, George Harne announced that he would resign as president of Magdalen College to become the Executive Dean for School of Arts & Sciences at the University of St. Thomas in Houston. Eric Buck took up the role of interim president for one year as the school searched for a new president. In July 2021, Ryan Messmore began as President of Magdalen College of the Liberal Arts.

In late 2023, the college announced that it would close after the spring semester of 2024. On its website, college leaders wrote that the college had experienced "financial challenges".

=== Presidents ===
1. Peter V. Sampo, 1974–1977
2. John Meehan, 1977–1998
3. Jeffrey Karls, 1998–2011
4. George Harne, 2011–2020
5. Eric Buck, 2020–2021 (interim)
6. Ryan Messmore, 2021–2024

== Catholic identity ==
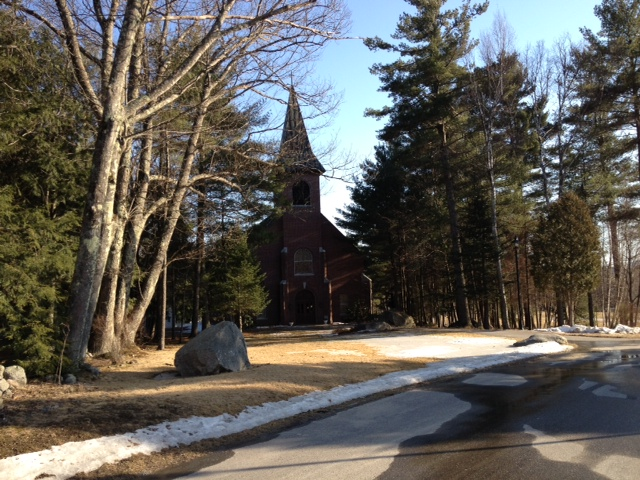
Chapel of Our Lady, Queen of Apostles, at Magdalen College

The Cardinal Newman Society recognized the college for its fidelity and Catholic identity. In 2011 the college was consecrated to the Sacred Heart and in 2014, the president outlined the principles of the college's approach to student life in an essay entitled "Finding God on the Quad: Pope Benedict XVI's Vision for Catholic Higher Education." Students regularly participated in the New Hampshire and National March for Life, were involved in public support for religious freedom, and participated in "Catholic Day at the State House" in 2015.

On March 13, 2015, the college announced its Dignitas scholarships (inspired by the example of Mother Teresa), a program that integrated pro-life work with service to the poor through international and local service opportunities.

After its students provided music for its first Mass in 2016, the college maintained a warm relationship with St. Stanislaus Catholic Church in Nashua, New Hampshire, a parish of the Priestly Fraternity of Saint Peter, where the traditional Latin Mass is celebrated exclusively. In January 2018, the college announced that Michael Gaitley, MIC, and his Marian Missionaries of Divine Mercy would take over campus ministries.

Commencement speakers included Ovide Lamontagne (2012), George Weigel (2013), Dan Burke (2014), and Ralph Martin (2015).

Beginning in 2011, the college began holding a celebration of the Tridentine form of the Roman Rite once a week, and from 2013 also of the Divine Liturgy in the Melkite Rite once a semester. In its celebration of the ordinary form of the Mass, the college's chaplain celebrated ad orientem, and the propers of the Mass are sung in Latin or English.

== Academics ==
The college offered curricula based on studying the great books of Western civilization both within the curriculum's core and in its five majors. In the college's Program of Studies the faculty primarily employed a Socratic pedagogy of questioning and discussion in small seminars. Courses of study were inspired by the classical trivium and quadrivium. Students may also receive a Vatican-established Apostolic Catechetical Diploma. The college offered majors, as of 2015, in Theology, Politics, Philosophy, Literature, and the great books.

In May 2019 the college's Program of Studies was awarded an "A" rating by the American Council of Trustees and Alumni, placing it among only four Catholic institutions with that rating.

=== Great books core curriculum ===
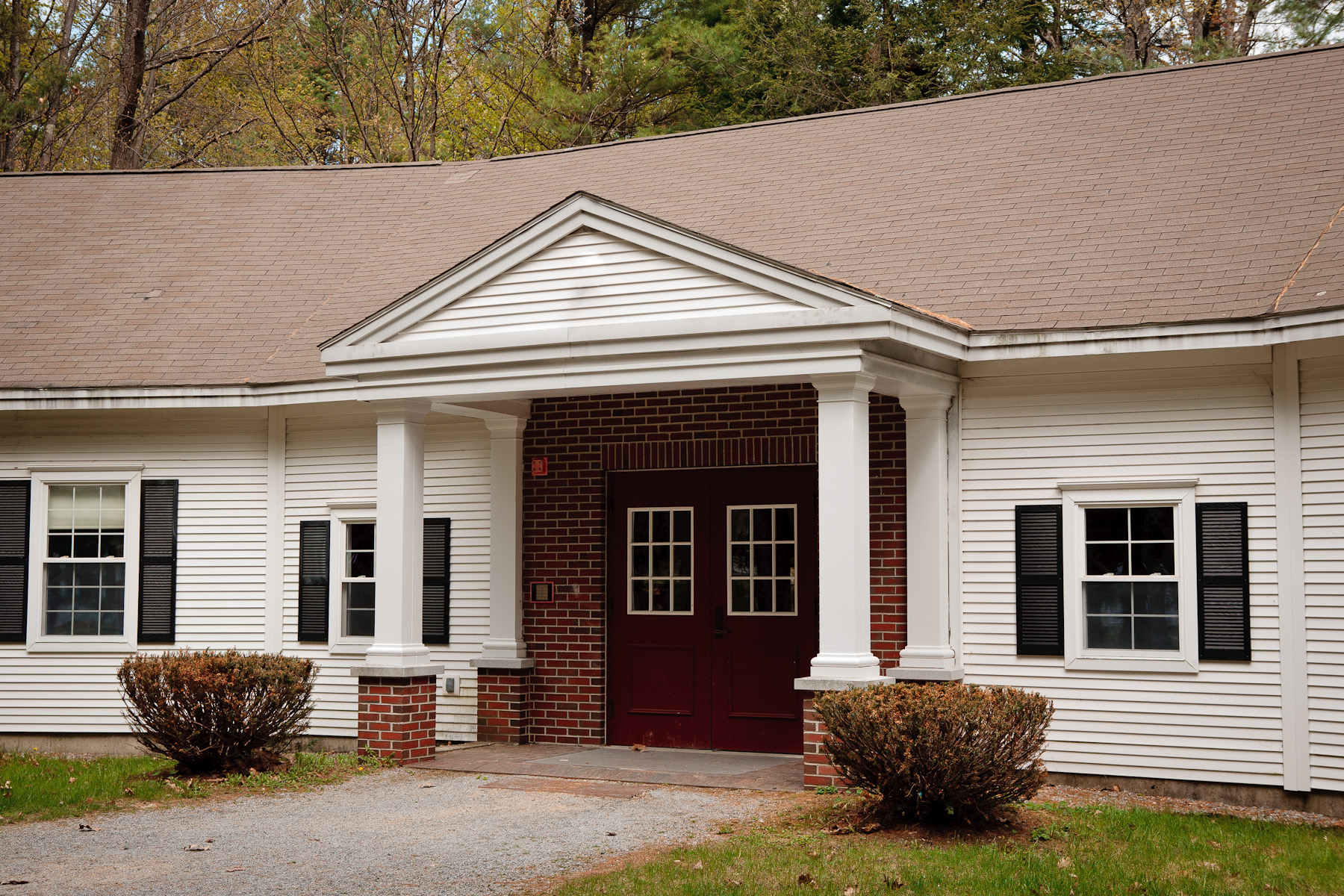
A classroom building at Magdalen College

With the exception of one major course per semester in the junior and senior years and capstone projects such as the Junior Project and senior thesis or portfolio, all students followed the same great books core curriculum. The course of studies included a four-year philosophy and humanities sequence of seminars, three years of theology leading to an Apostolic Catechetical Diploma, four years of music and art integrated within the Humanities cycle, two years of Greek or Latin, four semesters of science, and courses in logic, geometry, and writing. Students completed a junior project based in their major and, as seniors, completed comprehensive exams and had the opportunity to write a senior thesis.

=== Arts of the Beautiful program ===
The college offered students the opportunity to learn Gregorian chant and polyphony, and to participate in liturgies inspired by what Pope Benedict XVI called "the reform of the reform". Although chant and other forms of sacred music were employed at each Mass of the academic year, the liturgies for Holy Week and Easter were marked by extensive use of the Church's musical patrimony. The study of sacred music, music appreciation, and the visual arts in the Humanities cycle (as well as guest lectures) supplemented these opportunities for liturgical formation and were part of the college's "Arts of the Beautiful" program.

=== Degrees ===
Students were able to obtain an Associate of Liberal Arts and/or a Bachelor of Liberal Arts.

On October 17, 1983, the Sacred Congregation for the Clergy issued a rescript (Note: A rescript is a written reply to a request for a canonical "favor". Cf. canon 59 of the 1983 Code of Canon Law.) granting the college authority to award the "Diploma for Religious Instruction". Now called the "Apostolic Catechetical Diploma", this diploma was awarded to Catholic students who completed the eight-semester sequence of theological studies with at least a 2.0 GPA in each course and who pledged to teach Catholic doctrine in communion with the Holy See.

=== Accreditation ===
In 2009, the college reported the start of a self-study process for regional accreditation by the New England Association of Schools and Colleges (NEASC). Until 2012, (Note: In 2010, the AALE lost its recognition as an accrediting agency with the U.S. Department of Education ("Report of the Meeting of the National Advisory Committee on Institutional Quality and Integrity" (PDF). Department of Education. ed.gov.). For institutions accredited by AALE in 2010 or earlier, accreditation remained valid through July 1, 2012 ("Domestic Standards, Applications, and Publications". American Academy for Liberal Education. Archived from the original on April 6, 2013.).) the college was accredited through the American Academy for Liberal Education (AALE). In May 2013, the college officially withdrew from the AALE. The college gained "candidate" status with NEASC in 2013. In 2018, the college obtained NEASC regular regionally accredited status. In 2021, the college was put on probation status due to financial insecurity and an uncertain future.

== Student life ==
Sporting events took place from time to time between student teams from Magdalen College and the Thomas More College of Liberal Arts in volleyball. There were also occasional sporting events between faculty/staff and student teams.

=== Student organizations ===
Student organizations included:

- Student/President Advisory Council
- Student Activities Board
- Confraternity of St. Joseph
- Sodality of Mary
- Knights of Columbus
- Spes Vitae (Note: Spes Vitae means "Hope for Life" in Latin (Magdalen.edu, "Student Organizations", accessed April 5, 2013).) pro-life club
- St. Genesius Players
- Polyphony Choir
- Dancing Club
- Rowing Club
