= Thomas More College of Liberal Arts =

Liberal arts college in New Hampshire

Coordinates: 42°48′30″N 71°29′00″W

- Seal of Thomas More College of Liberal Arts
- Latin: Thomae Morae Societas Artium Liberalium
- Motto: Caritas congaudet veritati
- Motto in English: Charity rejoices in the truth
- Type: Private liberal arts college
- Established: 1978
- Accreditation: New England Association of Schools and Colleges
- Affiliations: The Center for the Restoration of Christian Culture
- Religious affiliation: Roman Catholic
- President: Matthew Walz
- Students: 89
- Location: Merrimack, New Hampshire, United States
- Campus: 14 acres (5.7 ha); Historic Colonial
- Website: thomasmorecollege.edu

The Thomas More College of Liberal Arts is a private Catholic liberal arts college in Merrimack, New Hampshire, United States. Established in 1978, it emphasizes classical education in the Catholic intellectual tradition and is named after Saint Thomas More.

== History ==
=== Founding ===
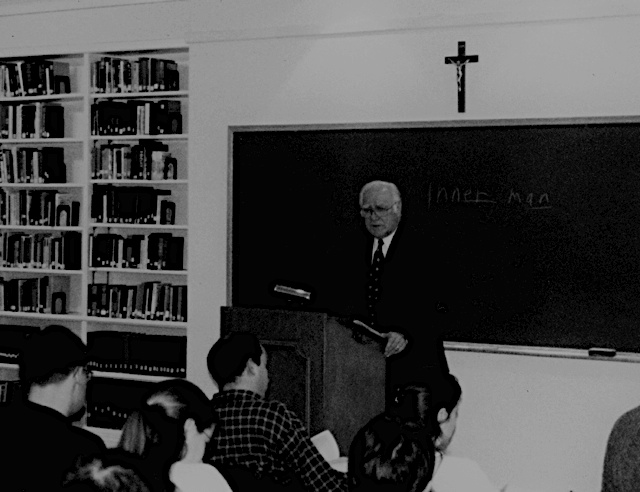
Dr. Peter Sampo Teaching at the Warren Memorial Library on the Thomas More College campus.

Thomas More College was founded in 1978, with political science professor Peter Sampo as its first president. Sampo had been a co-founder and president of both Cardinal Newman College in St. Louis and Magdalen College of the Liberal Arts, in New Hampshire. The curriculum, designed by educators Donald and Louise Cowan, associated with the University of Dallas, centered on the direct reading of foundational works of Western culture.

=== Since 2009 ===
In 2009, the curriculum was revised under president William Fahey to improve its chronological approach to topics and strengthen the presentation of Catholic themes. Distinct majors in literature, political science, and philosophy were phased out in favor of a unified liberal arts major based on "the great classics of western thought."

In the same year regional accrediting body the New England Association of Schools and Colleges placed the college on probation for two years on the ground that it was not meeting NEASC's standards for financial resources. The college improved its financial position, and the period of probation ended in 2011.

In late 2013, the college bought a 1908 mansion in the Nashville Historic District of Nashua. College president William Fahey indicated plans to use the historic house, originally built by shoe manufacturer Frank Anderson and later the home of Mount Saint Mary Seminary, a girls' high school, as an educational site and eventually also a dormitory.

=== Presidents ===
1. Peter V. Sampo, 1978–2006
2. Jeffrey Nelson, 2006–2009
3. William Fahey, 2009–present

== Academics ==
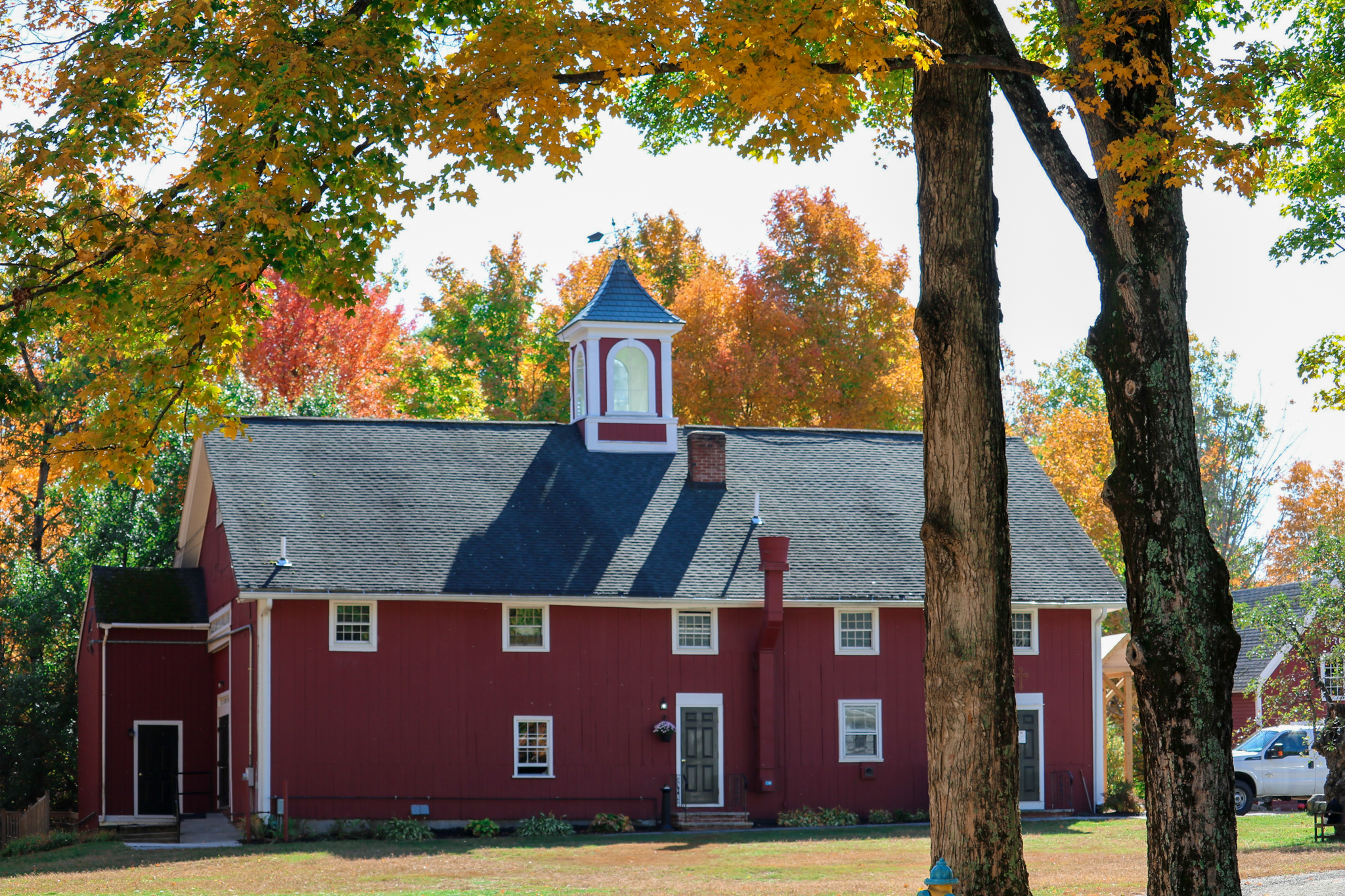
The college's multi-use building

Thomas More College of Liberal Arts offers one degree program: Bachelor of Arts in Liberal Arts. The college is accredited by the New England Commission of Higher Education. In 2010, the college started a program of teaching students practical skills in art and music, using the medieval guild system as a model.

For admissions, Thomas More College accepts the Classic Learning Test as alternatives to the SAT and ACT.

=== Curriculum ===
The first two years of the four-year program are dedicated to the Trivium (logic, rhetoric, and grammar) and the Quadrivium (geometry, astronomy, arithmetic, and music). Students read great works of Western literature, philosophy, and political science instead of textbooks. Students are also required to study a semester in Rome; this is done in the second semester of sophomore year.

Natural science, philosophy, scripture, and theology are all required courses. In their third year, students must present a junior project in front of a panel of three faculty members; in their fourth year, students produce a senior thesis and defend it before faculty and student peers.

== Publishing ==
The college has sponsored the Centre for Faith and Culture at Oxford, England, publisher of Second Spring, a journal on faith and culture, since 2007.

In April 2011, Thomas More College, together with Holy Spirit College in Atlanta, reached an agreement with the non-profit publisher Sophia Institute Press, which became the publishing division of the two colleges. The two colleges, in turn, appoint representatives to the board of directors of Sophia Institute.

In 2016, the college began its own publishing initiative, called the Thomas More College Press. To date the Thomas More College Press publishes the major works of Aristotle, as translated by Hippocrates Apostle, as well as books by Romano Guardini, John Senior, and Heinrich Rommen.

== Former faculty ==
- Louise Cowan (1916–2015), professor of English
- Anthony Esolen, professor of English Renaissance and classical literature, translator of Dante
- Joseph Pearce, St. John Henry Newman Visiting Chair in Catholic Studies
- Robert Royal, Catholic author and the president of the Faith & Reason Institute
- Peter V. Sampo (1931–2020), political science professor and first president of the college
