= Anthony Esolen =

American academic

Anthony M. Esolen
- Education: Princeton University; University of North Carolina at Chapel Hill
- Occupations: Academic, author
- Employer: Thales College
- Title: Distinguished Professor of Humanities

Anthony M. Esolen is a writer, social commentator, translator of classical poetry, and Distinguished Professor of Humanities at Thales College, having been invited to join the faculty in 2023. He previously taught at Furman University, Providence College, Thomas More College of Liberal Arts, and Magdalen College of the Liberal Arts.

Esolen has translated into English Dante's Divine Comedy, Lucretius' On the Nature of Things, and Torquato Tasso's Jerusalem Delivered. He is the author of over 30 books and over 1,000 articles in such publications as The Modern Age, The Catholic World Report, Chronicles, for which he serves as a contributing editor, The Claremont Review of Books, The Public Discourse, First Things, Crisis Magazine, The Catholic Thing, and Touchstone, for which he serves as a senior editor. He is a regular contributor to Magnificat, and has written frequently for a host of other online journals. He is a poet in his own right, and his book-length sacred poem, The Hundredfold, has been called a Christian poetic masterpiece.

Esolen is a Catholic, and his writings generally contain an identifiable conservative or traditionalist perspective. He has frequently criticized the concept of "diversity" as commonly understood in modern Western culture. Dissatisfaction over some of the views that he expressed contributed to his decision to leave Providence College.

== Early life and career ==
Esolen is of Italian ancestry. He was born in Archbald, Pennsylvania. Anthony Esolen graduated summa cum laude from Princeton University in 1981. He pursued graduate work at the University of North Carolina at Chapel Hill, where he earned his M.A. in 1981 and a Ph.D. in Renaissance literature in 1987. Esolen's dissertation, "A Rhetoric of Spenserian Irony," was directed by S.K. Heninger. He taught at Furman University from 1988 to 1990.

== Providence College ==
Esolen began teaching English at Providence College in 1990, becoming a full professor in 1995. He earned a reputation as a conservative Catholic author, and grew increasingly dissatisfied with the more liberal activist direction of Providence College, a Catholic university run by the Dominican Order. He is a critic of "diversity" training and guidelines as practiced at many American colleges and universities. In the summer of 2016, he remarked, "What counts for them as 'diversity' is governed entirely by a monotonous and predictable list of current political concerns. If you read a short story written in English by a Latina author living up the road in Worcester, that counts as 'diverse,' but if you read a romance written in Spanish by a Spanish author living in Spain four hundred years ago, that does not count as 'diverse.'"

In September 2016, Crisis Magazine published an article by Esolen titled "My College Succumbed to the Totalitarian Diversity Cult." Crisis Magazine wrote the title for the piece, according to Esolen. In the essay, Esolen argued that Western insistence on a modern politically defined idea of diversity as one of its core values was destructive to authentic cultures and was inherently contradictory to the Christian faith. He stated that people can only "be truly at one" when they are united by faith in God. Questioning the very western idea of diversity, he asked:

Is not that same call for diversity, when Catholics are doing the calling, a surrender of the Church to a political movement which is, for all its talk, a push for homogeneity, so that all the world will look not like the many-cultured Church, but rather like the monotone non-culture of western cities that have lost their faith in the transcendent and unifying God?

Esolen held that Catholicism "redeems not only individuals but peoples" preserving their culture as it does so, which is in contrast to "the secular preachers of diversity" who work "their hardest to efface that difference, to muffle all those who speak with the voice of the Church against the vision that those preachers have to offer—a vision that pretends to be 'multicultural,' but that is actually anti-cultural, and is characterized by all the totalitarian impulses to use the massive power of government to bring to heel those who decline to go along." He held that procedures turning over reported bias to a bias response team, was analogous to the infamous Star Chamber. Esolen maintained that initialisms such as LGBT were "the alphabet soup of cheered-on sexual proclivities. For some reason that does not include F, for Fornicators, or S, for swingers, or P, for pornographers, or W, for sex-workers, formerly called harlots, or A, for adulterers." He held that making reference to such as an identifier could not be practiced within Catholicism, since "a disordered inclination" can not be held to be an essential component of anyone. Esolen maintained that non-Catholic faculty within the College were backing the diversity program, in order to raise the question of "Is it permitted for a Catholic, at a college that advertises itself as Catholic, to affirm a Catholic view of sex and the family?" These non-Catholics "have made life hell for more than one of my friends" and some of them "would silence us for good, if they had the power."

Some students and faculty members of Providence College reacted with anger to the publication of the essay. Providence students organized a protest march. A group of faculty members of the school wrote a petition in which they charged that Esolen's writings contained repeated "racist, xenophobic, misogynist, homophobic and religiously chauvinist statements." The Rev. Brian Shanley, O.P., President of Providence College at the time, publicly distanced himself from Esolen's statements by claiming "that he speaks only for himself. He certainly does not speak for me, my administration, and for many others at Providence College who understand and value diversity in a very different sense from him." Meanwhile, Robert P. George, a conservative Catholic professor at Esolen's alma mater, Princeton University, defended him. He argued that students and faculty members who disagree with him "should respond in the currency of academic discourse—reasons, evidence, arguments—not by attempting to isolate, stigmatize, and marginalize him for stating dissenting opinions."

== Subsequent career ==
On May 4, 2017, it was announced that Esolen would join the faculty at Thomas More College of Liberal Arts in Merrimack, New Hampshire beginning the fall of 2017. On this occasion, he criticized the Providence College administration for becoming too "secular." In an essay praising his relationships at his new job, he said working at Providence was like "trying to shore up a crumbling wall" where the leadership was striving to "pass out lemonade to the professors with the sledge hammers."

On May 13, 2019, Esolen resigned from Thomas More citing increased Reflex Sympathetic Dystrophy leg pain triggered by travel for speaking engagements and his commute from the college and his home in Warner, New Hampshire. He was able to find a position at Northeast Catholic College located minutes from his home. In 2019, Esolen joined Northeast Catholic College, later renamed Magdalen College of the Liberal Arts, as a full faculty member and Writer-In-Residence.

== Literary work ==
Along with teaching, Esolen has published articles and books on a regular basis. He is a regular contributor to Magnificat and serves as a senior editor of Touchstone.

Esolen's verse translation of Dante Alighieri's Divine Comedy into English was published by Random House Modern Library. His translation of the Inferno appeared in 2002, the Purgatory in 2003, and the Paradise in 2005. In his translations, Esolen chose not to attempt a "preservation of Dante's rhyme in any systematic form." Dante's original Italian work relied heavily on rhyme. However, the English language has fewer rhyming words than the Italian language. Thus, according to Esolen, trying to recreate the sounds of the original Italian rhyme would have compromised "either meaning or music."

In lieu of Dante's famous terza rima, Esolen's translation depends on the use of blank verse. Esolen writes that the use of blank verse allows him to retain both the "meaning [and the] music" of Dante's original. The works also feature, alongside the English translation, the original Italian text. Esolen notes that this text "is based on the editions of Giorgio Petrocchi (1965) and Umberto Bosco and Giovanni Reggio" (1979)." Finally, the translations include Esolen's notes and commentary on the text, as well as illustrations by Gustave Doré. Esolen kept his most extensive notes for the back of each book, so as not to interrupt the reading of the main text. Anne Barbeau Gardiner, a professor emerita of English at the City University of New York, praised the translation for being "not only highly readable, but also vigorous and beautiful."

Esolen has written verse translations of other classical texts, including Torquato Tasso's Jerusalem Delivered (reviewed in Translation and Literature, Sixteenth-Century Journal, and International Journal of the Classical Tradition) and Lucretius' De rerum natura. Both were published by Johns Hopkins University Press.

He has argued that the Middle Ages were actually an enlightened time, so that the term "Dark Ages" is a misnomer. He cited the establishment of universities, the development of the carnival, and the contributions of famous saints such as Albertus Magnus and Thomas Aquinas to science and philosophy, all of which took place in the Middle Ages, as examples.

In 2011, Esolen published an essay in First Things in which he criticized what he saw as the "bumping boxcar language" of the New American Bible. Esolen attacked the NAB translations for "[p]refer[ing] the general to the specific, the abstract to the concrete, the vague to the exact." He went on to list several examples of Biblical passages in which he claimed that the true meaning or visceral nature of the words had been eroded.

== Publications ==
=== Translations ===
The following works were translated into English by Esolen:

- Lucretius, Titus; Esolen, Anthony M. (1995). On the Nature of Things: De rerum natura. Johns Hopkins Press. ISBN 978-0-8018-5055-4.
- Tasso, Torquato; Esolen, Anthony M. (2000). Jerusalem Delivered (Gerusalemme liberata). Baltimore, MD: Johns Hopkins University Press. ISBN 978-0-8018-6322-6.
- Dante Alighieri; Esolen, Anthony M. (2003). Inferno (Modern Library Classics). Modern Library. ISBN 978-0-8129-7006-7.
- Dante Alighieri; Esolen, Anthony M. (2004). Purgatory (Modern Library Classics). Modern Library. ISBN 978-0-8129-7125-5.
- Dante Alighieri; Esolen, Anthony M. (2007). Paradise (Modern Library Classics). Modern Library. ISBN 978-0-8129-7726-4.
- St. Augustine of Hippo; Esolen, Anthony M. (2023). Confessions. TAN Books. ISBN 9781505126860.

=== Books ===
The following books were written by Esolen:

- Ironies of Faith: The Laughter at the Heart of Christian Literature. Intercollegiate Studies Institute. June 15, 2007. ISBN 978-1-933859-21-7.
- The Politically Incorrect Guide to Western Civilization. The Politically Incorrect Guide. Regnery Publishing. 2008. ISBN 978-1-59698-059-4.
- The Beauty of the Word: A Running Commentary on the Roman Missal. Ignatius Press. 2010. ISBN 978-1-936260-40-9.
- Ten Ways to Destroy the Imagination of Your Child. Intercollegiate Studies Institute. November 5, 2010. ISBN 978-1-935191-88-9.
- Reflections on the Christian Life. Sophia Institute Press. February 20, 2012. ISBN 978-1-933184-85-2
- Defending Marriage: Twelve Arguments for Sanity. May 28, 2014. ISBN 978-1-61890-604-5
- Reclaiming Catholic Social Teaching. Sophia Institute Press. October 20, 2014. ISBN 978-1-933184-85-2
- Life Under Compulsion: Ten Ways to Destroy the Humanity of Your Child. Intercollegiate Studies Institute May 18, 2015. ISBN 978-1-61017-094-9
- Real Music: A Guide to the Timeless Hymns of the Church. TAN Books December 7, 2016. ISBN 978-1-61890-702-8
- Out of the Ashes: Rebuilding American Culture. Washington, D.C.: Regnery Publishing. 2017. ISBN 978-1-62157-514-6. OCLC 938991884.
- Nostalgia: Going Home in a Homeless World. Regnery Gateway. 2018. ISBN 978-1621578017.
- How the Church has Changed the World - Vol. I. Magnificat. 2019. ISBN 978-1949239041.
- Defending Boyhood: How Building Forts, Reading Stories, Playing Ball, and Praying to God Can Change the World. TAN Books March 25, 2019 ISBN 978-1-50511-242-9
- How the Church has Changed the World - Vol. II. Magnificat. 2020. ISBN 978-1949239300.
- In the Beginning Was the Word: An Annotated Reading of the Prologue of John. Angelico Press, 2021. ISBN 9781621387978
- Sex and the Unreal City: The Demolition of the Western Mind. Ignatius Press. 2020. ISBN 9781621643067
- No Apologies: Why Civilization Depends on the Strength of Men. Regnery Publishing. 2022. ISBN 9781684512348
- The Lies of Our Time. Sophia Institute Press. 2023. ISBN 9781644138021
