= Ilaria Ramelli =

Italian historian, author and academic (born 1973)

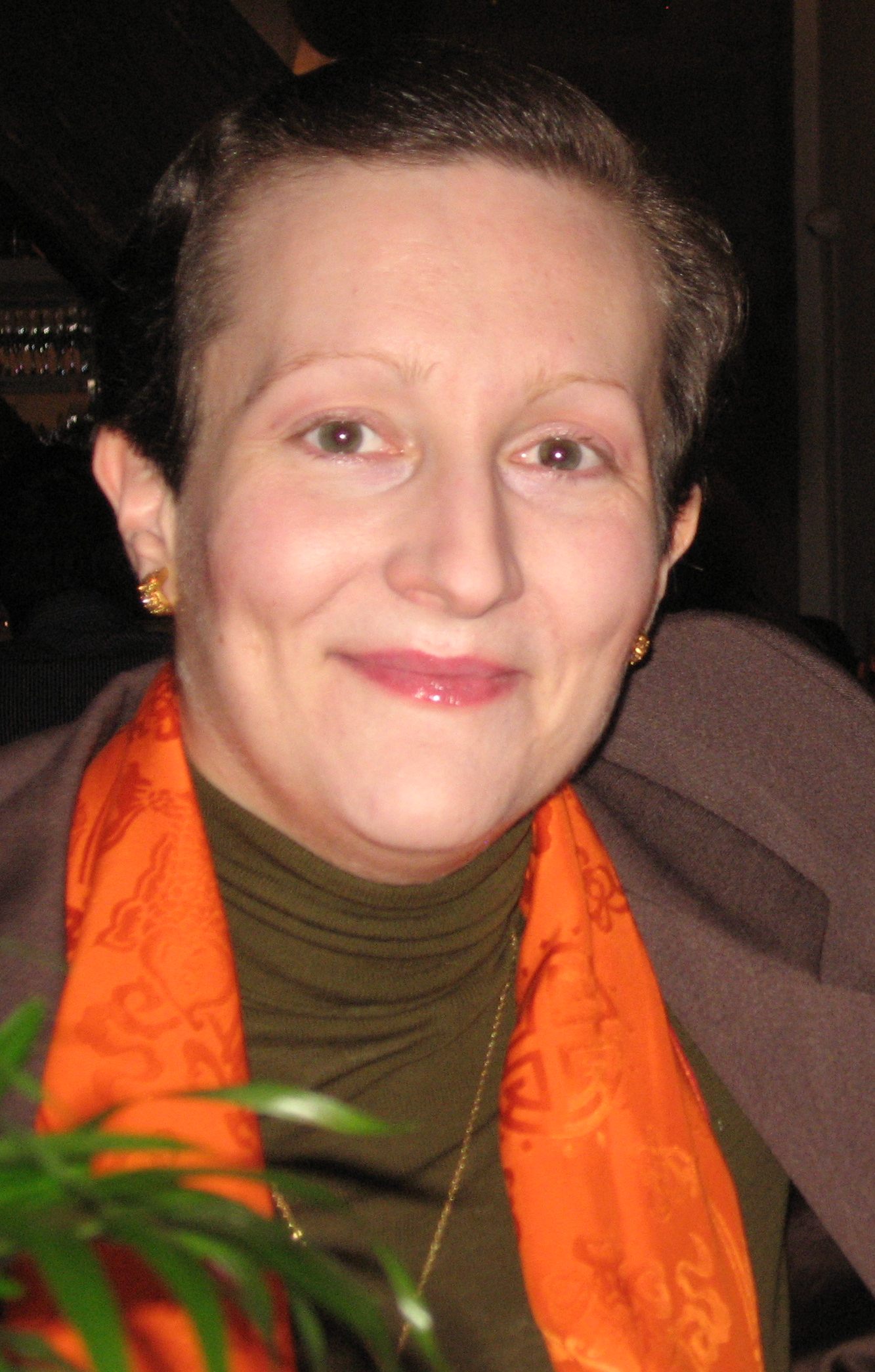
- Born: 1973 (age 52–53); Piacenza, Italy

Academic background
- Education: Università Cattolica del Sacro Cuore

Academic work
- Discipline: history
- Institutions: Pontifical University of Saint Thomas Aquinas; Durham University
- Main interests: ancient, late antique, and early mediaeval philosophy and theology

Ilaria L. E. Ramelli (born 1973) is an Italian-born historian, academic author, and university professor who specializes in ancient, late antique, and early mediaeval philosophy and theology.

== Life ==
Ilaria Ramelli was born in Piacenza in 1973. At the age of 8, she was involved in a serious road accident that left her with serious after-effects, forcing her to lie down. In her youth, she enjoyed painting. One of her paintings appears on the cover of one of her books.

=== Education ===
She earned two MAs (Classics with specialization in Early Christianity and Philosophy with specialization in History). She also holds a PhD (Classics and Early Christianity, 2000), a Doctorate honoris causa, a postdoctorate (Late Antiquity and Religion), and some Habilitations to Full Professor - Ordinarius (History of Philosophy, Classics, Greek Language and Literature).

== Academic appointments ==
After being Professor of Roman History, Ramelli has been Full Professor of Theology and endowed Chair (Angelicum), Humboldt Fellow at Erfurt University, Max-Weber-Kolleg (Max Weber Center), and Fellow of the Royal Historical Society as well as Professor (Durham University, Hon.; KUL) and Senior Member (CCSP, University of Cambridge). She has also been, e.g., Senior Research Fellow in Ancient and Patristic Philosophy (both at Durham University, for two fellowships, and at Corpus Christi College, Oxford), in Hellenic Studies at Princeton University, Fowler Hamilton Fellow at Oxford University.

== Awards ==
Ramelli has received a number of academic and scientific prizes and awards, including a Forschungspreis from the Humboldt Foundation (2017).

== Selected works ==
=== As author or co-author ===
- I romanzi antichi e il Cristianesimo: contesto e contatti, preface by B.P. Reardon, Madrid, Signifer 2001; Cascade Books, 2012. ISBN 978-1-62032-032-7.
- Le nozze di Filologia e Mercurio, (Il Pensiero occidentale). Bompiani, 2001.
- Allegoria, vol. I, L'età classica, Milan: Vita e Pensiero 2004, Temi metafisici e problemi del pensiero antico Series. ISBN 978-88-343-5007-2.
- Il βασιλεύς come νόμος ἔμψυχος tra diritto naturale e diritto divino: spunti platonici del concetto e sviluppi di età imperiale e tardoantica (Marcello Gigante International Classics Prize, 2006), Naples: Bibliopolis, 2006, Series: Memoirs of the Italian Institute of Philosophical Studies 34. ISBN 88-7088-528-3.
- Hierocles the Stoic: elements of ethics, fragments and excerpts. Brill - Society of Biblical Literature, 2009.
- Terms for eternity: Aiônios and aídios in classical and Christian texts. Gorgias Press, 2013; Berlin: De Gruyter, 2021.
- The Christian Doctrine of Apokatastasis: A Critical Assessment from the New Testament To Eriugena. Brill, 2013.
  The book was reviewed, e.g., in Theological Studies, Journal of Early Christian History, The International Journal of the Platonic Tradition. and The Journal of Theological Studies.
- Tempo ed eternità in età antica e patristica: filosofia greca, ebraismo e cristianesimo, Assisi: Cittadella, 2015. ISBN 978-88-308-1412-7.
- Evagrius’ Kephalaia Gnostika, Leiden-Atlanta: Brill-SBL, 2015. Pp. lxxxviii + 434. ISBN 1-62837-041-6 (hardback); ISBN 1-62837-039-4 (paperback)
- Social justice and the legitimacy of slavery: The role of philosophical asceticism from ancient Judaism to late antiquity. Oxford University Press, 2017. ISBN 978-0-19-877727-4.
- A Larger Hope? 1, prefaced by Richard Bauckham, Cascade Books, 2019.
- Bardaisan of Edessa: A Reassessment of the Evidence and a New Interpretation, Gorgias 2009; De Gruyter 2019.
- Patterns of Women’s Leadership in Ancient Christianity, co-edited, Oxford University Press, 2021.
- Eriugena’s Christian Neoplatonism and its Sources in Patristic and Ancient Philosophy, directed, Leuven: Peeters, 2021.
- Origen, the Philosophical Theologian: Trinity, Christology, and Philosophy-Theology Relation Selected Studies/Kleine Schriften, Berlin: De Gruyter, 2025.

=== As contributor ===
- "Unconditional Forgiveness in Christianity? Some reflections on ancient Christian sources and practices," in The Ethics of Forgiveness: A Collection of Essays (Routledge Studies in Ethics and Moral Theory). Routledge, 2011.
- "The Universal and Eternal Validity of Jesus' Priestly Sacrifice: The Epistle to the Hebrews in Support of Origen's Theory of Apokatastasis," in A Cloud of Witnesses: The Theology of Hebrews in its Ancient Contexts, edited by Richard Bauckham et al, Bloomsbury T&T Clark, 2008.
- "Divine Power in Origen of Alexandria: Sources and Aftermath," in Divine Powers in Late Antiquity, eds. Anna Marmodoro and Irini Fotini Viltanioti, Oxford: OUP, 2017, 177-198. ISBN 978-0-19-876720-6.
- "Gregory of Nyssa on the Soul (and the Restoration): From Plato to Origen," in Exploring Gregory of Nyssa: Historical and Philosophical Perspectives, eds Anna Marmodoro and Neil McLynn, Oxford: OUP, 2018, 110-141. ISBN 978-0-19-882642-2.
- "Origen," in A History of Mind and Body in Late Antiquity, Cambridge: Cambridge University Press, 2018, 245-266. ISBN 978-1-107-18121-2.
- "Epicureanism and Early Christianity," in Oxford Handbook to Epicurus and Epicureanism, ed. Phillip Mitsis, Oxford: Oxford University Press, 2020, 582-612. ISBN 978-0-19-974421-3.
- "Origen, Evagrius, and Dionysius," in Oxford Handbook of Dionysius the Areopagite, ed. Mark Edwards, Dimitrios Pallis, and Georgios Steiris, Oxford: Oxford University Press, 2022, 94-108. ISBN 978-0-19-881079-7

=== As editor ===
- Musonio Rufo, Diatribe, frammenti e testimonianze, Milan: Bompiani, 2001. Pp. 357. ISBN 978-88-452-9099-2.
- Anneo Cornuto, Compendio di teologia greca, Milan: Bompiani, 2003, Il Pensiero Occidentale. Pp. 607. ISBN 88-452-9249-5.
- Diogene Laerzio, Vite e dottrine dei più celebri filosofi, co-edited, Milan: Bompiani, 2005, Il Pensiero Occidentale. ISBN 88-452-3301-4.
- Gregorio di Nissa, sull'Anima e la Resurrezione, testo greco a fronte. Milan: Bompiani, 2007.
- Eschilo: Tutti i Frammenti con la Prima Traduzione degli Scolii Antichi e Bizantini, Milan: Bompiani, 2009, Il Pensiero Occidentale. Pp. 2061. ISBN 978-88-452-6289-0.
- Early Christian and Jewish Narrative: The Role of Religion in Shaping Narrative Forms, edited by Ilaria Ramelli and Judith Perkins, Tübingen: Mohr Siebeck, 2015. ISBN 978-3-16-152033-4
- Evagrius, the Cappadocians, and Neoplatonism, edited volume, Leuven: Peeters 2017.
- Wiley-Blackwell Companion to World Literature - Volume One: To 600 CE, co-edited, Oxford: Wiley-Blackwell, 2020.
- T&T Clark Handbook to the Early Church, co-edited, London: T&T Clark Bloomsbury Academic, 2021.
- Lovers of the Soul, Lovers of the Body. Philosophical and Religious Perspectives in Late Antiquity, Harvard University Press, 2022.
