= Judith Perkins =

American classical scholar

Judith Perkins (b. 13 June 1944) is Professor Emerita of Classics and Humanities at Saint Joseph College, Connecticut. She is an expert on early Christianity, Latin poetry, and the ancient novel.

== Education ==
Perkins is a trained Classicist. She received her BA in Latin from Mount Holyoke College. ^{1} She received her PhD from the University of Toronto in 1972. Her doctoral thesis was entitled Valerius Flaccius; Synonyms and Style.

== Career ==
In 1976, Perkins was hired to teach Classics at Saint Joseph College, Connecticut (now St Joseph University). where she is now Emerita. In 1979, she attended a National Endowment of the Humanities summer seminar led by Wayne Meeks on the social world of early Christianity at Yale University. The timing of the seminar enabled Perkins to manage childcare responsibilities, and subsequently she combined her research on Classics with early Christianity. Her insistence on bringing the two fields together has been described as 'one of her most significant contributions'. ^{2} Perkins was a long-standing contributor to the International Conference on the Ancient Novel (ICAN), and contributed to the field by mentoring younger scholars ^{2}

Perkins authored two important monographs, The Suffering Self: Pain and Narrative Representation in the Early Christian Era, and Roman Imperial Identities in the Early Christian Era.The Suffering Self had an 'enormous impact on how scholars of early Christianity understand depictions of the body in pain'. ^{2} Roman Imperial Identities examines how two cosmopolitan social entities constructed specific identities during the consolidation of the Roman empire.The book gave the reader a better understanding of Christianity as a distinct phenomenon and the broader world it inhabited. ^{2}

In 2019, Perkins was honoured with a Festschrift, The Narrative Self in Early Christianity: Essays in Honor of Judith Perkins, published by the Society of Biblical Literature, and featuring contributions from Virginia Burrus, Kate Cooper, and Ilaria Ramelli.

== Select bibliography ==
- Early Christian and Jewish Narrative: The Role of Religion in Shaping Narrative Forms, edited by Ilaria Ramelli and Judith Perkins, Tübingen: Mohr Siebeck, 2015. ISBN 978-3-16-152033-4
- The Ancient Novel and Early Christian and Jewish Narrative: Fictional Intersections (Barkhuis, 2013)
- (ed. by Donald Lateiner, Barbara K. Gold, and Judith Perkins) Roman Literature, Gender and Reception (Routledge, 2013)
- Roman Imperial Identities in the Early Christian Era (Routledge, 2008)
- Ancient Fiction and Early Christian Narrative (Society of Biblical Literature, 1998)
- The Suffering Self: Pain and Narrative Representation in the Early Christian Era (Routledge 1995)
