= Anesthesia: A Brief Reflection on Contemporary Aesthetics =

2008 novella by Tripp York

Anesthesia: A Brief Reflection on Contemporary Aesthetics is a novella written by Mennonite theologian Tripp York. Anesthesia explores the interconnections of love, death and philosophy. The novella is heavily influenced by Greek philosophy, comic books, pop culture, as well as the work of Søren Kierkegaard and Ludwig Wittgenstein. York's knowledge of theology also plays a prominent role albeit in a more negative fashion than found in his non-fiction.

== Plot summary ==
Anesthesia examines recent accounts of love in an attempt to suggest that the kind of romanticized understanding we have of love necessitates its own death. It begins with the musing of a graduating college student who is reflecting on the question of whether a young death, if it is a happy one, is a good death. Trajan (no last name is given), who is named after a Roman Emperor based on this emperor's persecution policy toward Christians, finds himself contemplating the murder of best friend (Brett) at the hands of a woman (Anna) whom both young men were smitten with. Anna, who functions as the tangible argument York is discussing, convinces Trajan that Brett's death was a good death because Brett had reached the apex of human fulfillment. He had fallen in love yet due to love's inability to be sustained (because they understand love to be defined as yearning), his life must come to an end as the love itself, inasmuch as it has reached satisfaction, must end. Brett's eventual pursuit of other loves would only call into question the each love prior to the next. Likewise, Anna requests an end to her own life based on her love for Trajan. She recognizes both the temporal yet eternal nature of love defined as yearning and wishes to be freed from it in order to die within it.

Many themes are explored throughout the book. Anna takes on a personality akin to Joan of Arc and it is through this lens that York weaves a strong though tragic female character. Issues of sex, race and patriarchy are spread throughout, as well as critiques of pop culture, though remaining heavily indebted to pop culture. Most of his characters and places in the book are references to someone or something else. He includes a number of references to comic book characters, including Frank Castle (The Punisher) and X-Men character, Kitty Pryde. The book has been likened, in terms of style, to that of both Chuck Palahniuk and J.D. Salinger.

Anesthesia was inspired by the song of the same name written by punk rock band Bad Religion. It may be that the character of Brett was named after the guitarist of Bad Religion, Brett Gurewitz, who wrong the song. Mr. Brett, as he often goes by, suggests that the song was a metaphor about the numbing effects of love although there are speculations that the song is really about drug addiction. York's fictitious first-person memoir plays with this notion of love as numbing, though he reverses it by connecting it to the ancient god of love Eros who was born of, by some accounts, the god of war Ares.

== Characters ==
Trajan is the protagonist and narrator of the story. He is a 21-year-old philosophy student narrating the events that had taken place only one year prior. He is very introspective and quick-witted yet appears paralysed by his knowledge rather than empowered by it. He appears to be a more grown-up version of Holden Caulfield.

Anna is the love interest of the book and the very character of which the story hangs. She is described as being pale-skinned who is as beautiful as she is plain. The description of her physical features is reminiscent of Freyja, the goddess of Norse paganism. She is infatuated with her own martyrdom.

Brett functions as the "everyman".

Mr. Glaucon, who may be named after one of Plato's interlocutors (Glaucon), is referred to as the messenger's messenger. He functions as the catalyst who brings about Trajan's realization that there may be no such thing as beauty, truth or goodness (the Greek transcendental predicates of being).

Katie Anne only appears in the epilogue and does not speak. Due to her name and eventual relationship with a Russian bodybuilder who paints, the speculation is that this character, who is similar to Anna, is based on the comic book character Kitty Pryde.
