= Louise Cowan =

American literary critic and teacher (1916–2015)

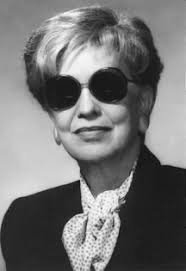
- Texan intellectual Louise Cowan
- Born: Mary Louise Shillingburg; December 22, 1916; Fort Worth, Texas, U.S.
- Died: November 16, 2015 (aged 98); Dallas, Texas, U.S.
- Education: Texas Christian University (BA 1946, MA 1947); Vanderbilt University (PhD 1953)
- Spouse: Donald Cowan (m. 1939; died 2002)
- Awards: Frankel Prize (1991)

Mary Louise Cowan (née Shillingburg; December 22, 1916 – November 16, 2015) was an American literary critic and teacher, and wife of the physicist and University of Dallas president Donald Cowan. She taught at the University of Dallas, Texas Christian University, Thomas More College of Liberal Arts, and the Dallas Institute of Humanities and Culture. As "one of the most famous faculty members" at the University of Dallas, she was a prominent figure in Dallas society, a mentor and friend to many Dallas dignitaries, and one of the city's leading intellectuals.

== Early life and education ==
Cowan was born Mary Louise Shillingburg in Fort Worth, Texas on December 22, 1916. She was first raised Methodist, but became agnostic atheist in childhood. She studied music and planned to take a scholarship at Skidmore College before reconsidering a musical career. Instead, she married Donald Cowan in 1939 and then earned a BA (1946) and an MA (1947) in English from Texas Christian University while he earned his degree in physics.

She was a doctoral student of the poet Donald Davidson at Vanderbilt University, where she became a friend to members of the Southern Agrarians, and was considered to be the critical heir to their legacy. She was the first woman teaching fellow at Vanderbilt. She was awarded her PhD in 1953 for a dissertation on the Fugitive poets and their part in the Southern Renascence. During her time at Vanderbilt, one of her students convinced her to begin conversion to Catholicism just before he died of leukemia.

== Career ==
=== Texas Christian University, 1953–1959 ===
After completing her PhD in 1953, Cowan returned to Fort Worth with her husband, where she taught literature at Texas Christian University and he worked in nuclear physics and nuclear engineering at Convair. During this time, she completed her conversion to Catholicism in 1955, describing it as "completing her intellectual quest," and she went blind for a period of several months due to side effects of a thyroid treatment. The blindness was temporary, but required facial surgery, and she became known for limited eyesight and for wearing dark glasses ever after; she compensated for her eyes by memorizing literature and poetry extensively.

While at Texas Christian University, Cowan worked to turn her Vanderbilt dissertation on the Fugitive poets into her first book, The Fugitive Group: A Literary History, which was published in 1959; reviewers praised its wealth of documentary detail.

=== The University of Dallas, 1959–1980 ===
Cowan and her husband, Donald Cowan, moved to the University of Dallas in 1959, where she was recruited to chair the English department and he to chair the physics department. He rose to the position of university president in 1962. They worked for twenty years to establish the core curriculum at the University of Dallas. They sought to counter relativism and mediocrity by establishing "anti-egalitarian" models based on the classics of Western civilization. They replaced composition courses and textbooks with "great books" classics after arriving in 1959.

In the 1960s, Louise Cowan conceptualized and established a graduate program in politics and literature, for which she recruited the conservative and Straussian political philosopher Willmoore Kendall, who had previously aroused controversy for his teaching at Yale University. She also began the Dallas Woman’s Study Group, which became an important feature of Dallas women's society. She was a prominent figure in Dallas society, a mentor and friend to many Dallas dignitaries, and one of the city's leading intellectuals.

In 1971, to coincide with the fifty year anniversary of the Fugitive poetry magazine in April 1972, Cowan published The Southern Critics: An Introduction to the Criticism of John Crowe Ransom, Allen Tate, Donald Davidson, Robert Penn Warren, Cleanth Brooks, and Andrew Lytle.

Although they were successful and popular for decades, conflicts with the Board of Managers led to a protracted leave of absence for both Cowan and her husband, beginning in 1977. The Cowans resigned in the summer of 1980 in protest over new and "utilitarian" administrative policies, but they would later return to campus in 1994.

=== The Dallas Institute, 1980–1994 ===
In 1980, Cowan, her husband, and four others, James Hillman, Robert Sardello, Joanne Stroud, and Gail Thomas, founded the Dallas Institute of Humanities and Culture.

In "A Nation at Risk", Cowan's 1983 report for the Commission on Excellence in Education, she appraised in withering terms what she believed to be the deficiencies of public education. She compared the "mediocre educational performance" in the United States to "an act of war" on America's well-being as a society. By 1984, during the Reagan administration, she had obtained substantial funding from the National Endowment for the Humanities for a Teachers Academy at the Dallas Institute.

During this time, she began editing a series of collaborative books on the four literary and poetic genres of comedy, tragedy, lyric, and epic, beginning The Terrain of Comedy in 1984 and then continuing with The Epic Cosmos (1992).

In 1991, Cowan was awarded the Frankel Prize, now the National Humanities Medal. Among his commendatory comments about Cowan, President George Bush said "She ranks among the great builders of education in Texas."

=== Late career, 1994–2015 ===
Cowan and her husband returned to the University of Dallas campus in 1994 and continued to lead the Dallas Institute as well. She edited an Invitation to the Classics with Os Guinness for publication in 1998. She completed her collaborative series on literary genres with The Tragic Abyss (2004) and The Prospect of Lyric (2012).

Sewanee University awarded Cowan an honorary doctorate in 2014.

== Influence ==
Cowan was influential in fostering the liberal arts and helping shape core curricula for several liberal arts universities. The University of Dallas' curriculum in "literary tradition" was her single-handed design. Comic theory was one of her lifelong interests. In studies of the American South, she was an influential critic of William Faulkner, the Fugitive Group, and other Southern writers.

== Personal life and death ==
Cowan married Donald Cowan in 1939 after they met in a Presbyterian church choir when she was 20. They had one son, Bainard Cowan, in 1949, who became a professor of comparative literature at Louisiana State University. Donald died before Louise, in 2002.

Cowan died on November 16, 2015, in Dallas, Texas, at the age of 98. She had seven living grandchildren and twelve living great-grandchildren at the time of her death.

== Selected books ==
- The Fugitive Group: A Literary History (1959).
- The Southern Critics: An Introduction to the Criticism of John Crowe Ransom, Allen Tate, Donald Davidson, Robert Penn Warren, Cleanth Brooks, and Andrew Lytle (1971).
- The Terrain of Comedy (edited and introduced) (1984).
- Classic Texts and the Nature of Authority: An Account of a Principals' Institute Conducted by the Dallas Institute of Humanities and Culture (edited with Donald Cowan, with essays and commentary) (1993).
- Invitation to the Classics (edited with Os Guinness) (1998).
