= Robert Royal (author) =

American writer (born 1949)

Robert Royal (born December 21, 1949) is an American author, editor, historian, essayist, and Catholic intellectual. He is the founder and president of the Faith & Reason Institute, a Washington, D.C.–based educational organization and the editor-in-chief of The Catholic Thing, an online journal of Catholic commentary and analysis. Royal has written extensively on Catholicism, Western civilization, religious freedom, literature, higher education, and international affairs, and is regarded as one of the leading Catholic public intellectuals in the United States.

== Early life and education ==
Robert Royal was born in Connecticut and received his BA in English and MA in Italian Studies from Brown University and his PhD in Comparative Literature from The Catholic University of America. He was a Fulbright Scholar.

== Career ==
Royal taught literature and the humanities at Brown University, Rhode Island College, and the Catholic University of America. His academic work focused on comparative literature, intellectual history and religion. Alongside his teaching career, he increasingly became involved in public scholarship and commentary on religion, politics, and Western civilization.

In the early 1980s, Royal became Vice President for Research at the Ethics and Public Policy Center (EPPC) in Washington, D.C., one of the leading American think tanks examining the relationship between moral philosophy, religion, and public policy. At the EPPC he contributed research and commentary on international religious freedom, Catholic social teaching, democracy, and cultural affairs.

His work reflected a broader effort among American Catholic intellectuals to engage questions of public ethics while drawing upon the philosophical traditions of both classical antiquity and Christian thought. During these years he organized and participated in conferences, lectures, and policy discussions concerning the role of religion within democratic societies.

In 1999, Royal founded the Faith & Reason Institute, a Washington, D.C.–based public policy and educational organization dedicated to examining the role of religion in public life and promoting dialogue between faith, culture, and democratic institutions.

Royal is also the founding editor-in-chief of The Catholic Thing, an online journal launched in 2008 that publishes daily essays on Catholic theology, philosophy, politics, history, literature, and culture.

His essays and opinion pieces have appeared in publications including The Wall Street Journal, The Washington Post, National Review, The Wilson Quarterly, The Catholic Historical Review, and numerous other newspapers, magazines, and journals. His commentary frequently addresses the interaction of religion, politics, ethics, education, international affairs, and the cultural history of Christianity.

== Scholarship ==
Royal's scholarship focuses on Catholic intellectual history, religious persecution, political philosophy, and the cultural development of Christianity in the modern world. His books combine historical research with intellectual biography and have examined subjects ranging from twentieth-century Catholic thought and Christian martyrdom to papal diplomacy and the relationship between religion and democratic society.

Among his best-known works is The Catholic Martyrs of the Twentieth Century, a historical study documenting the persecution and deaths of Catholics under Nazi, Fascist, and Communist regimes. The book has been cited as an important contribution to scholarship on modern Christian martyrdom and religious persecution.

His later works include The Pope's Army, an examination of the Pontifical Swiss Guard and the historical development of papal military institutions; The God That Did Not Fail, which explores the resurgence of religious belief among twentieth-century intellectuals following the decline of Marxism and secular ideologies.

In A Deeper Vision, Royal traces the development of modern Catholic intellectual life through the writings of philosophers, theologians, historians, poets, novelists, and cultural critics. The work examines the contributions of figures including Jacques Maritain, Bernard Lonergan, Joseph Pieper, Edith Stein, Alasdair MacIntyre, Charles Taylor, Romano Guardini, Karl Rahner, Henri de Lubac, Karol Wojtyła, Joseph Ratzinger, Hans Urs von Balthasar, and literary figures such as G. K. Chesterton, J. R. R. Tolkien, Graham Greene, Christopher Dawson, and Czesław Miłosz. Rather than presenting isolated biographies, Royal argues that these thinkers collectively shaped a distinct Catholic intellectual revival during the twentieth century.

Royal has also translated books and articles from French, Spanish, and Italian; including J.-P. Torrell’s Initiation à saint Thomas d’Aquin (Catholic University of America Press, 1996), Roberto Papini’s The Christian Democrat International (Rowman & Littlefield, 1997), and Yves Simon’s The Ethiopian Campaign and French Political Thought (University of Notre Dame Press 2009).

Robert Royal was appointed the first St. John Henry Newman Chair of Catholic Studies at Thomas More College in 2020 and continues to teach and lecture as a Visiting Fellow at Thomas More College’s campuses in New Hampshire and Rome.

== Bibliography ==
- 1492 And All That: Political Manipulations of History, 1992
- Reinventing the American People: Unity and Diversity Today, 1995
- The Virgin and the Dynamo: Use and Abuse of Religion in Environmental Debates, 1999
- Dante Alighieri: Divine Comedy, Divine Spirituality, 1999
- The Catholic Martyrs of the Twentieth Century: A Comprehensive Global History, 2000
- The Pope's Army: 500 Years of the Papal Swiss Guard, 2006
- The God that Did Not Fail: How Religion Built and Sustains the West, 2006
- A Deeper Vision: The Catholic Intellectual Tradition in the Twentieth Century, 2015
- Columbus and the Crisis of the West (2020)
