= Donald Cowan =

American educator and physicist (1914–2002)

- Born: May 26, 1914; Fort Worth, Texas, U.S.
- Died: 2002 (aged 87–88); Dallas, Texas, U.S.
- Known for: President of the University of Dallas 1962–1977

Academic background
- Education: Texas Christian University (BA 1947); Vanderbilt University (PhD 1951)

Academic work
- Discipline: Physics
- Sub-discipline: Nuclear physics
- Institutions: Vanderbilt University (1951–1953); Texas Christian University (1956–1959); University of Dallas (1959–1977; 1994–?)

Donald Andrew Cowan (May 26, 1914 – 2002) was an American educator and nuclear physicist. He was president of the University of Dallas 1962–1977, where he retired as a University Professor. He was particularly known for his work with his wife, literary critic and teacher Louise Cowan, to grow the University of Dallas and to center its programs around a traditionalist core curriculum focused on great books.

== Early life and education ==
Cowan was born May 26, 1914, in Fort Worth, Texas. After graduating high school during the Great Depression and at first unable to attend college, he studied radar for the US Air Force. He married Louise Cowan (née Shillingburg) in 1939. He then attended Texas Christian University, graduating with an A.B. in physics in 1947, and next he earned his PhD in physics from Vanderbilt University in 1951.

== Career ==
After earning his PhD, Cowan briefly served as an assistant professor of physics at Vanderbilt University. In 1953, he and his wife then came back to Fort Worth, Texas for her to teach at Texas Christian University. He worked at the nuclear physics laboratory at Convair in Fort Worth until 1955, then became manager of their Atomic Industrial Program. He later served as an advisor to the Texas Governor's Advisory Commission on Atomic Energy. He became an associate professor at Texas Christian University in 1956.

In 1959, the Cowans moved to the Catholic University of Dallas, where he became a professor of physics and head of the sciences department. He became president of the University of Dallas in 1962 and served in the position through 1977, retiring as a University Professor. He succeeded Robert J. Morris (president 1960–1962). In this role, he and his wife transformed the curriculum of the university to focus on a core of great books education.

He was succeeded as president first by acting president Damian C. Fandall, a Dominican priest, in March 1977, and then by medievalist John R. Sommerfeldt (1978–1980). Cowan was allegedly forced out and made to take a leave of absence in 1977 after disagreements with university board members associated with Texas Instruments (TI) about the importance of distance learning; the source further reports that he was replaced with a TI executive, but former TI chief financial officer Bryan F. Smith (1920–2007) served as chancellor of the university concurrently with the end of Cowan's presidency (1976–1978) rather than replacing him as president.

After his term as president, he and his wife founded the Dallas Institute of Humanities and Culture. They returned to the University of Dallas in 1994.

In 1988, he published a book on education and the importance of classics and myths in liberal arts education titled Unbinding Prometheus: Education for the Coming Age.

== Personal life, death, and legacy ==
Cowan married Mary Louise Shillingburg, later well known as Louise Cowan, in 1939 in Fort Worth, Texas. They had one son, Bainard Cowan, in 1949, and they remained married until Donald's death; she died in 2015.

He developed Alzheimer's disease in the 1990s and died in Dallas of complications of the disease in 2002.

Cowan and his wife are namesakes of the Donald And Louise Cowan Center and (with William A. Blakley) the Cowan - Blakley Memorial Library at the University of Dallas, and he is the namesake of the University of Dallas Donald A. Cowan Physics Institute.

== Selected works ==
- Unbinding Prometheus: Education for the Coming Age. 1988. The Dallas Institute Publications. ISBN 978-0911005332
