= Ruth Mazo Karras =

American historian (born 1957)

Professor Ruth Mazo Karras
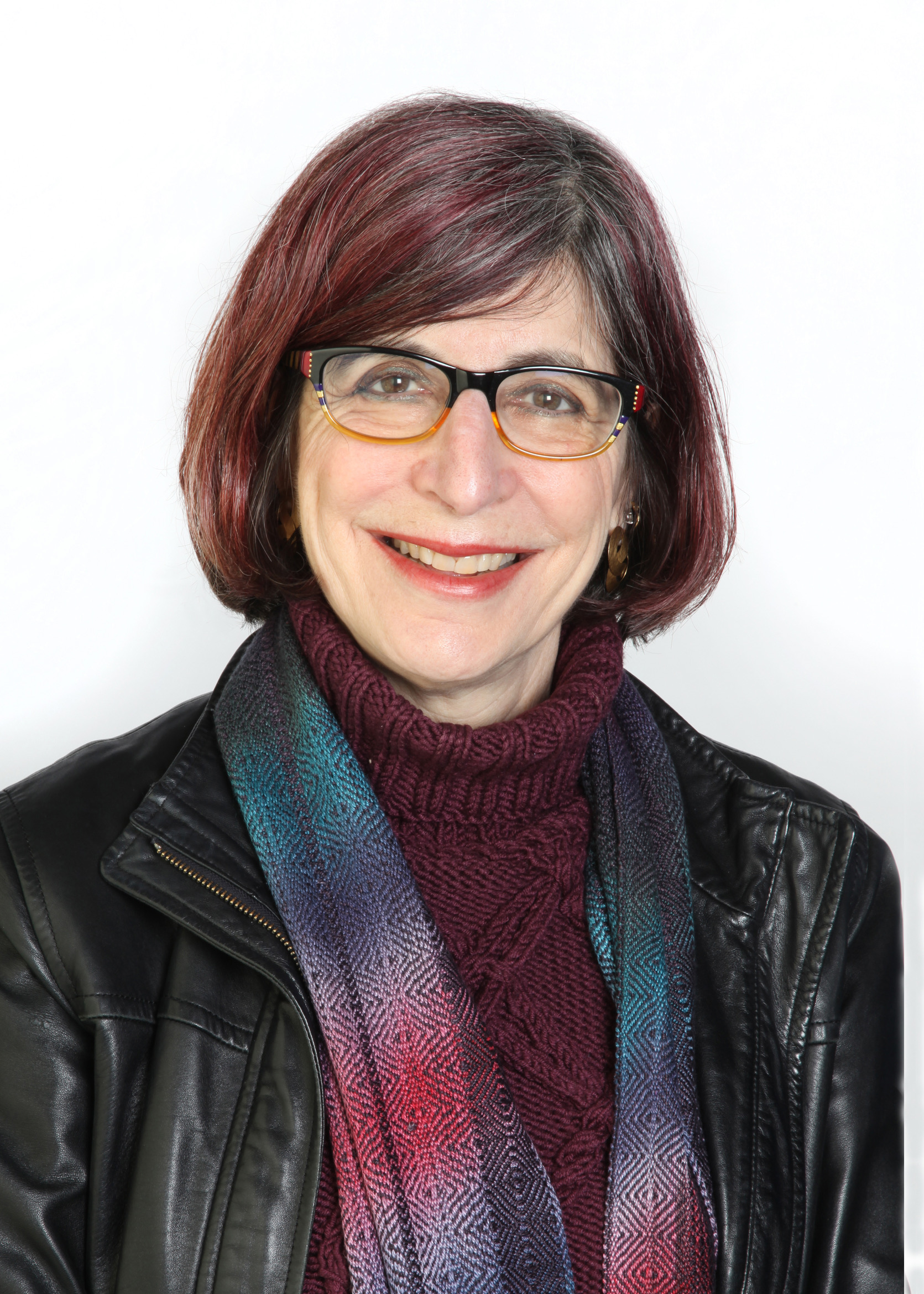
- Born: Ruth Mazo Karras; 1957 (age 68–69); Chicago, Illinois, U.S.
- Occupations: Historian and academic
- Known for: Scholar of medieval religion, sexuality, gender studies, slavery, and marriage
- Title: Lecky Professor of History

Academic background
- Education: Yale University (BA, MPhil, PhD); University of Oxford (MPhil)
- Thesis: Slavery in Medieval Scandinavia (1985)
- Doctoral advisor: John Boswell, Jaroslav Pelikan

Academic work
- Discipline: History
- Sub-discipline: Middle Ages; History of sexuality; History of religions; History of marriage
- Institutions: University of Pennsylvania; Temple University; University of Minnesota; Trinity College Dublin
- Main interests: Religion masculinity, gender, marriage, slavery
- Notable works: From Boys to Men, Unmarriages: Women, Men, and Sexual Unions in the Middle Ages and Sexuality in Medieval Europe: Doing Unto Others

Ruth Mazo Karras (born in 1957) is an American historian, scholar and medievalist whose academic research and publications are on religion, sexuality, marriage, slavery, gender studies, and the history of women in the late Middle Ages. She received her BA, MPhil, and PhD in history from Yale University, and an MPhil in European archaeology from the University of Oxford, where she was a Rhodes Scholar in 1979. Among the most cited medieval historians globally, Karras was the President of the Medieval Academy of America in 2019–20, and currently holds the chair as the Lecky Professor of History at Trinity College Dublin.

Karras is an author and critic of the Middle Ages, whose interests include masculinity and sexuality in Christian and Jewish societies. Her book Unmarriages: Women, Men, and Sexual Unions in the Middle Ages, was named co-winner of the American Historical Association's Joan Kelly Memorial Prize in Women's History in 2012. Her other notable works include From Boys to Men and Sexuality in Medieval Europe: Doing Unto Others.

She was an assistant professor of history at the University of Pennsylvania from 1985 to 1993, and in 2018, was appointed a visiting fellow at the University of St Andrews' Institute for Medieval Studies. Before taking up her post in Dublin, Karras was also the Distinguished Teaching Professor of History at the University of Minnesota.

== Education and career ==
Ruth Mazo Karras was born in Chicago, Illinois on February 23, 1957. Karras attended Yale University, where she completed a Bachelor of Arts in 1979, Master of Philosophy in 1983 and Doctor of Philosophy in History in 1985. She completed a Master of Philosophy in European Archaeology at the University of Oxford in 1981.

She was assistant professor of history at the University of Pennsylvania, Philadelphia from 1985 to 1993. While teaching at Temple University, she was associate professor from 1993-1996, professor of history from 1996-2000, director of the Intellectual Heritage Program from 1999-2000 and Associate Dean of the College of Liberal Arts from 1999-2000. Karras spent eighteen years (2000-2018) at the University of Minnesota, Minneapolis as professor of history and was named Distinguished Teaching Professor for her work with postgraduates. Since 2018, she has been the Lecky Professor of History at Trinity College Dublin, teaching courses on medieval sources, marriages, and Christianity and Judaism during the Middle Ages.

== Academic research ==
=== Scholarly discipline and focus ===
In the field of medieval studies, Karras has spent her professional career studying medieval masculinity, sexuality, gender roles and the history of women. The research foundations of her work are focused on the intersections of social, legal and cultural history in medieval societies. As primary sources, Karras employs court records, hagiography, prescriptive texts, administrative documents, and Icelandic sagas to inform her analysis. Her current research is focused on the masculine figure of King David in medieval Christian and Jewish cultures. She works with dissertation and thesis students whose work is based on the central to late Middle Ages; Karras also works with postgraduates focusing on the cultural and social histories of women and sexuality.

=== Notable works ===
Select publications from her research on masculinity include: the book From Boys to Men (2003), “Young Knights Under the Feminine Gaze” (2002), "Separating the Men from the Goats" (1999), "Sharing Wine, Women, and Song" (1997), and the fourth edition of her book, Sexuality in Medieval Europe (2005). Select publications from her research on women and sexuality include: Common Women (1996), “Women’s Labors” (2004), Unmarriages (2012), and “Royal Masculinity in Kingless Societies (2016). She also co-edited, with medieval scholar Judith Bennett, The Oxford Handbook of Women and Gender in Medieval Europe (2013). Karras also has published works focused on the institution of medieval marriage such as “Marriage” (2012), Law and the Illicit in Medieval Europe (2008) and “Marriage and the Creation of Kin in the Sagas” (2003).

=== Reception ===
Karras has received praise for her innovative research approaches when considering medieval masculinities and analyzing the sexual unions of marriage and prostitution during the Middle Ages. Some medieval scholars have found From Boys to Men to be a founding document in the study of men's history and a success in medieval scholarship for its development of social class expectations and experiences of socialization as being critical to how male masculinities formed separate from women. Several other medieval scholars have praised Unmarriages for its fresh research complied with unpublished church court records and the intersectionality between legal, sexual and economic histories.

However, other historians criticize Karras's reductive qualities during the interpretative process of analyzing the legal, religious and literary texts. Her discourse, according to some medieval scholars, places all individuals into one category and does not allow for the possibility of other explanations to be applied regarding definitional questions. Some historians criticize the presentist agenda and generalizations made by Karras when she formulates conclusions on some primary sources.

== Awards and fellowships ==
Karras has received awards and honors throughout her career, including: the Rhodes Scholarship from 1979-1981; the National Endowment for the Humanities grant in 1989; American Philosophical Society research grant in 1989; she was named Scholar of the College of Liberal Arts at the University of Minnesota, Minneapolis in 2003; she was accepted as a member of the Institute for Advanced Study in Princeton, New Jersey in 2003-2004; she received the Distinguished Women Scholars Award in Humanities, Social Sciences and Arts at the University of Minnesota, Minneapolis in 2008; she was honored with the Dean's Medal and Graduate-Professional Teaching Award at the University of Minnesota, Minneapolis in 2010; in 2012, she was honored as "Feminist Foremother" by the Society for Medieval Feminist Scholarship and the Joan Kelly Prize in Women's History from the American Historical Association for her work in Unmarriages; and she was an invited member to the Israel Institute for Advanced Study in 2016-2017.

Karras has received fellowships such as the National Endowment for the Humanities in 1993-1994; the American Philosophical Society sabbatical fellowship in 2004-2005; the Medieval Academy of America fellowship in 2009; the American Council of Learned Societies Fellowship in 2010; the Katz Center for Advanced Judaic Studies Fellowship at the University of Pennsylvania in 2012; the European Institutes for Advanced Study Fellowship in 2016-2017; and the Donald Bullough Fellowship from the St. Andrews Institute for Medieval Studies in 2018.

== Memberships, editorial and board positions ==
Karras has been recognized with memberships of the Medieval Academy of America, American Historical Association, Women's History Association of Ireland, and Berkshire Conference of Women Historians.

She was assistant editor of Common Knowledge (published by Duke University) from 1993 to 1998 and since 2001; for Medieval Feminist Newsletter, she was editor from 1994 to 1999 and general editor from 1997 to 1998; general editor of the "Middle Ages Series" for the University of Pennsylvania Press since 1994; associate editor of Journal of British Studies since 2004; and has contributed to academic journals including Journal of Women's History, Scandinavian Studies, Early Medieval Europe, American Historical Review, and Journal of the History of Sexuality. Karras was also a member of the advisory board for the Journal of the History of Sexuality from 1990 to 1993, Medieval Feminist Newsletter from 1991 to 1994, and History Compass since 2005.

Karras was the North American co-editor for Gender and History from 2008 to 2013; President of the Berkshire Conference on the History of Women from 2005 to 2008; was on the editorial board for the American Historical Review; and the Medieval Academy of America as chair of the Ad Hoc Committee on Harassment in 2018, and president from 2019 to 2020.

== Selected publications ==
- [Edited volume with Elisheva Baumgarten and Katelyn Mesler], Entangled Histories: Knowledge, Authority, and Jewish Culture in the Thirteenth Century (Philadelphia: University of Pennsylvania Press, 2017) ISBN 9780812248685.
- Sexuality in Medieval Europe: Doing unto Others 3rd edition (London: Routledge, 2017) ISBN 9781138860889.
- [Edited volume with Judith Bennett], Oxford Handbook of Women and Gender in Medieval Europe (Oxford: Oxford University Press, 2013) ISBN 9780199582174.
- Unmarriages: Women, Men, and Sexual Unions in the Middle Ages (Philadelphia: University of Pennsylvania Press, 2012) ISBN 9780812244205.
- "The Regulation of Sexuality in the Late Middle Ages: England and France," Speculum: A Journal of Medieval Studies 86 (2011) 1010–1039.
- [Tiffany Vann Sprecher and Ruth Mazo Karras,] "The Midwife and the Church: Ecclesiastical Regulation of Midwives in Brie, 1499-1504," Bulletin of the History of Medicine 85 (2011), 171–192.
- [Cameron Bradley and Ruth Mazo Karras,] "Masculine Sexuality and a Double Standard in Early Thirteenth-Century Flanders?" Leidschrift 25 (2010), 63–77.
- [Ruth Mazo Karras and Jacqueline Murray,] “The Sexual Body,” in A Cultural History of the Human Body, vol. 2, In the Medieval Age, ed. Linda Kalof (Oxford: Berg, 2010), 59–75.
- “Marriage, Concubinage, and the Law,” in Law and the Illicit in Medieval Europe, ed. Ruth Mazo Karras, Joel Kaye, and E. Ann Matter (Philadelphia: University of Pennsylvania Press, 2008), 117–129.
- [Edited volume with Joel Kaye and E. Ann Matter,] Law and the Illicit in Medieval Europe (Philadelphia: University of Pennsylvania Press, 2008) ISBN 9780812221060.
- From Boys to Men: Formations of Masculinity in Late Medieval Europe (Philadelphia: University of Pennsylvania Press, 2003) ISBN 9780812218343.
- Common Women: Prostitution and Sexuality in Medieval England (Oxford: Oxford University Press, 1996) ISBN 9786612384189.
- Slavery and Society in Medieval Scandinavia (New Haven: Yale University Press, 1988) ISBN 9780300041217.
- [Ruth Mazo Karras and Tom Linkinen,] "John/Eleanor Rykener Revisited," in "Founding Feminisms in Medieval Studies," part 2, ed. Laine E. Doggett and Daniel E. O'Sullivan (England: Boydell and Brewer, 2016), 111-122
