= Anna Maria Chetwode =

Irish novelist

- Born: fl. 1827; County Cork

Anna Maria Chetwode known as Miss Chetwode (fl. 1827) was an Irish novelist.

== Life ==
Anna Maria Chetwode was the daughter of Reverend John Chetwode of Glanmire, County Cork, and Elizabeth Chetwode (née Hamilton). She was the granddaughter of Knightley Chetwode, a friend of Jonathan Swift. Miss Chetwode has been identified as Anna Maria by eliminating her parents' other daughters. Reverend John Chetwode wrote poetry, but was never published. He was rector at Rathconey in Glanmire, from 1790 until his death in 1814. Chetwode was still living in Glanmire in 1821. Chetwode travelled to Russia in the early 1800s, staying near Moscow with Yekaterina Vorontsova-Dashkova at her Troitskoe estate. Through the marriage of her sister, Elizabeth Hester, to Robert Wilmot, Deputy Recorder of Cork, she was connected to his sisters Katherine and Martha.

Chetwode wrote at least three novels, though she is believed to have authored more. Her books Blue-stocking Hall (1827) and Tales of my time (1829) were previously incorrectly attributed to a minister in East Anglia, William Pitt Scargill. The Irish antiquarian, John Windele, identifies Chetwode as the author of these books in 1839. Blue-stocking Hall is an epistolary novel set in County Kerry, and advocates for women's education. A book called Snugborough has also been ascribed to Chetwode. A number of Chetwode's poems, noted with her initials, are amongst the Wilmot papers in the Royal Irish Academy. In these papers there is a poem by Chetwode in memory of Thomas Addis Emmet.
