= Elisabeth van Dedem Lecky =

Dutch-Irish writer, historian and suffragist

Elisabeth Lecky
- Born: Catharina Elisabeth Boldewina Baroness van Dedem; April 15, 1842 Deventer, Netherlands
- Died: May 23, 1912 (aged 70) London, England
- Spouse: William Edward Hartpole Lecky (m. 1871; d. 1903)

Elisabeth van Dedem Lecky (15 April 1842 – 23 May 1912; née Catharina Elisabeth Boldewina Baroness van Dedem) was a Dutch-Irish writer, historian and suffragist.

== Background ==
Elisabeth Lecky van Dedem was born in Deventer, Netherlands. She was a member of the Dutch aristocratic Van Dedem family, who were prominent in the industrial development of the Netherlands. Her parents were lieutenant general Willem Karel Jan baron van Dedem and Anna Philippina Catharina baroness Sloet van Hagensdorp. Her brother was the lawyer and politician Willem Karel van Dedem. In her youth, she served as lady-in-waiting to Sophie of Württemberg.

In 1871, she married William Edward Hartpole Lecky, an Irish historian, essayist, political theorist, and provost of Trinity College Dublin. She endowed the Lecky Chair of History at Trinity College, Dublin in her husband's honour.

Her husband's mother, Isabella Wilmot, was the niece of early nineteenth-century travellers Martha and Katherine Wilmot. Lecky formed a friendship with Martha's daughter, Catherine Anne Daschkaw Brooke (née Bradford, and named after the sisters' host Princess Dashkova), who bequeathed her several of the Wilmot sisters' manuscripts. Lecky donated these manuscripts to the Royal Irish Academy in 1903, which now form the Library's Wilmot-Dashkova Collection.

== Career ==
Lecky was a prolific writer, contributing travel writing, political essays and editorial commentary to English periodicals including the British Medical Journal, The Nineteenth Century, and Living Age.

She actively campaigned for human rights. She joined prominent suffragists in petitioning for the extension of Parliamentary suffrage alongside Millicent Fawcett and Elizabeth Garrett Anderson in 1897. She raised funds and agitated on behalf of the Irish Distressed Ladies Fund, as well as for the higher education of women in Ireland through her support of Alexandra College, Dublin.

Lecky also engaged in biographical and historical writing. In 1900, she edited and introduced the military autobiography of her ancestor, Anton Boudewijn Gijsbert van Dedem van Gelder. Following her husband William Lecky's death she wrote his biography, A Memoir of the Right Honourable William Edward Hartpole Lecky, Member of the French Institute and of the British Academy (1909), and edited a posthumous collection of his essays, Historical and Political Essays (1908).
