= General Bradford =

General Bradford may refer to:

- Roland Bradford (1892–1917), British Army brigadier general
- Thomas Bradford (1777–1853), British Army lieutenant general
- Wilmot Henry Bradford (1815–1914), British Army lieutenant general
