= Robert Marc Mazo =

American theoretical physical chemist (1930–2025)

Robert Marc Mazo Professor emeritus
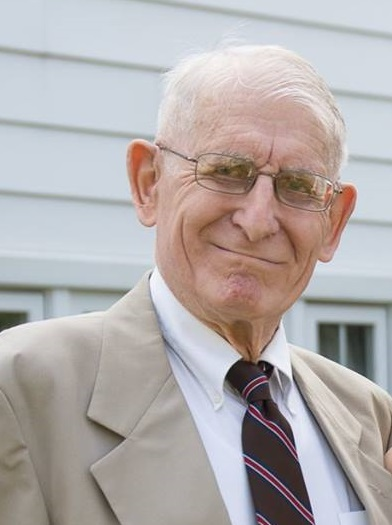
- Born: October 3, 1930; Brooklyn, New York, U.S.
- Died: February 23, 2025 (aged 94)
- Other name: Bob Mazo
- Occupations: Theoretical physical chemist and educator
- Children: 3
- Awards: American Physical Society Fellow

Academic background
- Education: A.B., Harvard University, 1952; M.S., Yale University, 1953; Ph.D., Yale University, 1955
- Thesis: Theoretical Studies On Low Temperature Phenomena (1955)
- Doctoral advisor: Lars Onsager; John Gamble Kirkwood

Robert Marc Mazo (October 2, 1930 – February 23, 2025) was an American theoretical physical chemist who specialized in statistical mechanics. Educated at Harvard and Yale, he was a research associate at the University of Chicago, and taught at the California Institute of Technology prior to joining the University of Oregon faculty in 1962. He was designated a professor emeritus in 1996. He was a member of the American Association of University Professors and a Fellow of the American Physical Society.

== Early life and education ==
Robert Marc Mazo, born October 3, 1930, in Brooklyn, New York, was the son of Nathan and Rose Marion (Mazo) Mazo. While in high school in 1948, Mazo won the Seventh Science Talent Search with the project, "Reactions in Liquid Ammonia".

Mazo completed a A.B. at Harvard University in 1952, and an M.S. in Science at Yale University in 1953. With NSF fellowship funding, he earned a Doctor of Philosophy degree at Yale University in 1955, with his dissertation, Theoretical Studies On Low Temperature Phenomena, advised by Lars Onsager and John Gamble Kirkwood.

Mazo and Joan Ruth Spector wed in 1954, and their family includes a daughter, Ruth Mazo Karras, and two sons. Mazo died on February 23, 2025 in Gladwyne, Pennsylvania.

== Career ==
Before joining the faculty of the University of Oregon in 1962, Mazo was a postdoctoral fellow at Institute voor Theoretische Physica, University of Amsterdam and a research associate at the University of Chicago (sponsored by the National Science Foundation). He also held an assistant professorship at the California Institute of Technology.

Mazo's research interests were "Exclusively theoretical", and have included "Brownian motion processes, Markov processes, Probabilities, Statistical mechanics, and Transport theory."

During Mazo's 33 year career at the University of Oregon, he served at various times as chair of the chemistry department, director of the Institute Theoretical Science, and as associate dean of the graduate school. He was also a program director of the National Science Foundation.

Mazo died on February 23, 2025, at the age of 94.

== Selected publications ==
=== Books ===
- Mazo, Robert M. (October 23, 2008). Brownian Motion: Fluctuations, Dynamics, and Applications. OUP Oxford. ISBN 978-0-19-156508-3.
- Mazo, Robert M. (1967). Statistical mechanical theories of transport processes. Pergamon Press. ASIN B0006BOPK4.
- Girardeau, M.D; Mazo, R.M. (1973). "Variational methods in statistical mechanics". In Prigogine, Ilya; Rice, Stuart A (eds.). Advances in Chemical Physics, Volume 24. John Wiley & Sons. pp. 187–245. ISBN 978-0-470-14409-1.

=== Articles ===
- Mazo, Robert M. (December 1, 1969). "On the theory of brownian motion. III. Two-body distribution function". Journal of Statistical Physics. 1 (4): 559–562. doi:10.1007/BF01024130. ISSN 1572-9613. S2CID 121554698.
- Mittenthal, Jay E.; Mazo, Robert M. (February 7, 1983). "A model for shape generation by strain and cell-cell adhesion in the epithelium of an arthropod leg segment". Journal of Theoretical Biology. 100 (3): 443–483. doi:10.1016/0022-5193(83)90441-1. ISSN 0022-5193. PMID 6834865.
- Ben-Naim, Arieh; Mazo, Robert M. (October 1993). "Size dependence of the solvation free energies of large solutes". The Journal of Physical Chemistry. 97 (41): 10829–10834. doi:10.1021/j100143a050. ISSN 0022-3654.
- Paul, E.; Mazo, R. M. (August 1969). "Hydrodynamic Properties of a Plane‐Polygonal Polymer, According to Kirkwood–Riseman Theory". The Journal of Chemical Physics. 51 (3): 1102–1107. doi:10.1063/1.1672109. ISSN 0021-9606.
- Mazo, Robert M. (October 15, 1965). "On the Theory of the Concentration Dependence of the Self‐Diffusion Coefficient of Micelles". The Journal of Chemical Physics. 43 (8): 2873–2877. doi:10.1063/1.1697219. ISSN 0021-9606.

== Awards, honors ==
- Alfred P. Sloan Fellow, 1961-65
- NSF Senior Postdoctoral Fellow, 1968-69
- Heinrich Hertz Fellow (West Germany)
- Meyerhoff Fellow (Israel)
- Fellow of the American Physical Society, citation: For his many contributions to the statistical mechanics of transport processes, especially to the understanding of Brownian motion and the couplings of moving molecules, 1983.
