= Walter Alison Phillips =

English historian (1864–1950)

Walter Alison Phillips MRIA
- Born: 21 October 1864; Epsom, Surrey, England
- Died: 28 October 1950 (aged 86)

Academic background
- Education: Merchant Taylors' School; Merton College, Oxford; St John's College, Oxford

Academic work
- Discipline: History
- Sub-discipline: History of Europe
- Institutions: Trinity College Dublin

Walter Alison Phillips MRIA (21 October 1864 – 28 October 1950) was an English historian, a specialist in the history of Europe in the 19th century. From 1914 to 1939 he was the first holder of the Lecky chair of History in Trinity College Dublin. Most of his writing is in the name of W. Alison Phillips, and he was sometimes referred to as Alison Phillips.

A former president of the Oxford Union and special correspondent of The Times newspaper, he was a prolific author, including contributions to the Encyclopædia Britannica, of which for eight years he was chief assistant editor.

== Early life ==
The son of John and Jane Phillips of Epsom in Surrey, Phillips was educated at Merchant Taylors' School, which he left in 1882, then at Merton College, Oxford, where he was an exhibitioner, and lastly from 1886 at St John's, where he was Senior Scholar. He graduated BA in 1885, with first class honours in History, and MA in 1889.

In the Michaelmas term of 1886, he was President of the Oxford Union. On 7 June 1887, as a guest in the Cambridge Union, he supported the motion "That in the opinion of this House it is desirable to concede Home Rule for Ireland", while Sir John Gorst, a former Solicitor General, came to speak against the motion.

== Career ==
At first, Phillips concentrated his efforts on writing. His first book, published in 1896, was a translation of selected poems of Walther von der Vogelweide, followed the next year by The War of Greek Independence, 1821 to 1833. In 1901 appeared his Modern Europe, 1815–1899.

From 1903 to 1911, Phillips was Chief Assistant Editor of the projected 11th edition of the Encyclopædia Britannica, serving under Hugh Chisholm, who was editor-in-chief. In 1912, he went to South America as a Special Correspondent of The Times newspaper, and then in 1913 was on the staff of The Times. In 1914 he was appointed Lecky Professor of Modern History in Trinity College Dublin, the first holder of the new chair, in which he remained until his retirement in 1939. From 1939 until his death he was an honorary Fellow of his old Oxford college, Merton.

Phillips was strongly opposed to Irish Home Rule and is said to have declared that "Ireland is not a nation, but two peoples separated by a deeper gulf than that dividing Ireland from Great Britain", though this quote has also been attributed to future British Prime Minister Bonar Law. His 1923 book The Revolution in Ireland 1906–1923 was criticized for being too partisan of the Unionist point of view.

By 1922, Phillips was a member of the Royal Irish Academy (MRIA). Outside his own specialism in European history, he contributed articles to the Encyclopædia Britannica on musical and literary subjects, including the Nibelungenlied.

== Publications ==
- Phillips, Walter Alison (1896). Selected Poems of Walter von der Vogelweide, the Minnesinger, done into English verse, with an introduction and six illustrations. London: Smith, Elder – via Internet Archive.
- Phillips, W. Alison (1897). The War of Greek Independence, 1821 to 1833. London: Smith, Elder – via Internet Archive.
- Phillips, W. Alison (1901). Modern Europe, 1815–1899. Periods of European History. Vol. VIII. London: Rivingtons – via Internet Archive.
- Phillips, W. Alison (1905) [1903]. George Canning. Oxford Biographies (new and cheaper ed.). London: Methuen – via Internet Archive.
- Ward, Adolphus William; Prothero, G. W.; Leathes, Stanley, eds. (1907). The Restoration. Cambridge Modern History. Vol. v.10. Cambridge: Cambridge University Press – via Internet Archive.
  - chapters by W. Alison Phillips: I: "The Congresses, 1815–22"; VI: "Greece and the Balkan Peninsula"; XVII: "Mehemet Ali"
- Phillips, Walter Alison (1920) [1914]. The Confederation of Europe; A Study of the European Alliance, 1813–1823, as an Experiment in the International Organization of Peace (2nd ed.). London: Longmans, Green – via Internet Archive.
- Many articles for the Encyclopædia Britannica, Eleventh Edition, signed by the initials "W. A. P."; some published separately on the outbreak of the First World War:
  - Phillips, Walter Alison; Headlam, James Wycliffe; Holland, Arthur William (1914). A Short History of Germany and her Colonies. London: Encyclopædia Britannica – via Internet Archive.
  - Steed, H. Wickham; Phillips, Walter Alison; Hannay, David (1914). A Short History of Austria-Hungary and Poland. London: Encyclopædia Britannica – via Internet Archive.
- Phillips, W. Alison (1926) [1923]. The Revolution in Ireland 1906–1923 (2nd ed.). London: Longmans, Green – via Internet Archive.
- Phillips, Walter Alison, ed. (1933–1934). History of the Church of Ireland: from the Earliest Times to the Present Day. London: Oxford University Press. [in 3 volumes]
