= Constantia Maxwell =

Irish historian

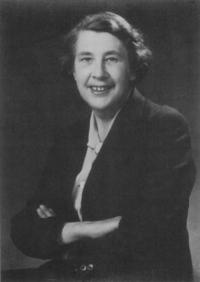
Constantia Elizabeth Maxwell (1886-1962) the first woman appointed to the academic staff of Trinity College Dublin

Constantia Elizabeth Maxwell (1886–1962) was an Irish historian who became the first woman to join Trinity College Dublin as a Professor.

== Early life and education ==
Maxwell was the daughter of Scottish ophthalmic surgeon Patrick W. Maxwell and Elizabeth Maxwell née Suckling. She was born in Dublin where her father had accepted a position in the Royal Victoria Eye and Ear Hospital in 1884. She had one sister and one brother. Her sister Euphan became the first woman ophthalmic surgeon in Ireland, succeeding her father at the Eye and Ear Hospital. Her brother was killed in the First World War. Maxwell was educated in Scotland, coming back to Trinity College, Dublin for her undergraduate education. She was among the first cohort of female students admitted to Trinity College which opened its doors to women in 1904. She was a brilliant student and graduating at the top of her class in History and Political Science in 1908. She spent a year at Bedford College, London making valuable academic contacts, before returning to Trinity.

== Academic career ==
In 1909, Maxwell became the first woman on the academic staff in Trinity College when she became lecturer in modern history. In 1932 she was awarded an Litt.D. She was given a personal chair in economic history in 1939, the first female professor and when in 1945 she was appointed to the prestigious Lecky chair in modern history, she became the first woman to hold a full-time chair in Trinity. Despite this, as with other women, Maxwell was subject to the "six o'clock rule", whereby women had to leave the College precincts in the early evening. The discrimination against women which took many forms, continued into the late twentieth century. Despite this, Maxwell had strong conservative instincts with respect to reform and disliked upsetting the existing order. Maxwell was a pioneer in her study of economic history at a time when it was generally ignored. The historian R.B. McDowell confirmed that as his professor, Maxwell, who later became a friend, influenced his intellectual life. He was her only research student. Trinity College instituted a scholarship named after Professor Maxwell for Masters students in the Faculty of Arts, Humanities, and Social Sciences.

== Select publications ==
Maxwell's first book, A Short History of Ireland was written for use in schools. Irish History from Contemporary Sources 1509-1610 was ground-breaking in providing an accessible source book of documents for students. It reached a very wide public. She edited Arthur Young's Tour of Ireland in 1925 and wrote a history of Trinity College. In 1936 Maxwell published Dublin under the Georges followed shortly after by Country and Town in Ireland under the Georges. These were considered her best work, winning both popular and academic acclaim. They later attracted criticism from Irish nationalists, who accused her of favouring the ruling elite and ignoring the native Catholic populace. Subsequent to her retirement in 1951 she published one more book, The Stranger in Ireland.

== Personal life ==
Maxwell lived with her sister at the family home in Dublin and after her retirement moved to England where she died in February 1962. An obituary in Trinity described her as 'a deeply learned and cultivated woman of much sympathy and understanding, and much modesty and even humility for all her accomplishment and knowledge[;] her shrewd judgments on her subject and on her university [were] tinged always, it seemed, by an amused and ironic detachment which extended itself to all human affairs.'

There is a portrait of Maxwell in the National Gallery of Ireland.
