= Martha Wilmot =

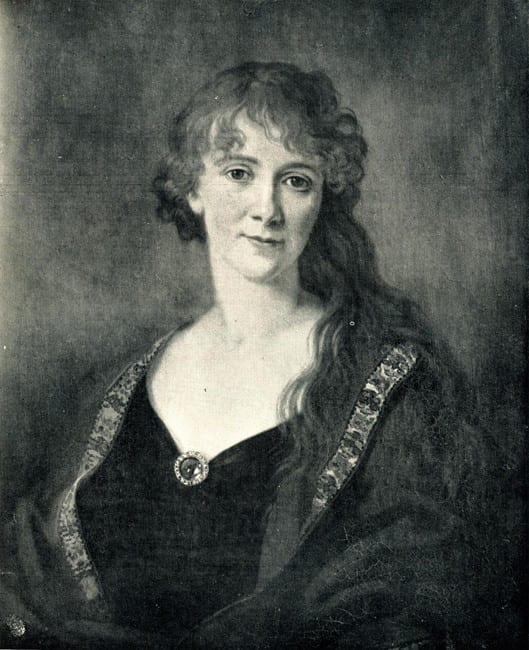
- Born: 1775; Glanmire, County Cork, Ireland
- Died: 18 December 1873 (aged 97–98); Taney Hill house, Dublin
- Occupation: Writer
- Writing career
- Period: 18th century

Martha Wilmot (1775 – 18 December 1873) was an Irish traveller and diarist.

== Early life ==
Martha Wilmot was born in 1775 in Glanmire, County Cork. Her parents were Edward and Martha Wilmot (née Moore). She had five sisters and three brothers. Her father was from Derbyshire, England, having served as a captain of the 40th Regiment of Foot, and port surveyor of the revenue board in Cork and Drogheda. Wilmot was educated at home, and following the death of a brother in 1802, her cousin Catherine Hamilton urged her to visit her brother's friend, the Princess Dashkova of Russia.

== Time in Russia ==
Wilmot began her four-month journey to Russia in 1803, travelling to the country estate of the princess, Troitskoe. While there, she took part in court life and became the princess' close confidante. While touring with the princess, Wilmot met Aleksei Orlov, and in her honour he ordered his regiment to stage a fake battle. She kept a diary and wrote letters home to Ireland frequently. She also encouraged the princess to write an autobiographical memoir, which Dashkova dedicated to Wilmot as her "young friend" and gave her permission to publish the manuscript. Wilmot's sister, Katherine, arrived in Troitskoe in 1805 to bring her sister home, but she stayed there as a guest for another two years. Between frequent trips to Moscow, Wilmot transcribed a copy of the princess' memoirs, with her sister translating them from the original French. Her sister left Russia in 1807 with the memoirs transcript after the Wilmots learned they were under threat from Madame Shcherbenin, an estranged woman who bore illegitimate children by Dashkova's son, who predeceased her, and who was suspicious of their intentions.

In 1808, Wilmot left Russia when hostilities broke out between England and Russia, despite objections from the princess who gave her a number of gifts including a watch owned by Peter the Great and a fan owned by Empress Catherine. While leaving St Petersburg, Wilmot was stopped and detained by customs officials who believed her to be in possession of secret documents. Fearing for her safety, she burnt the original manuscript of Dashkova's memoirs, and some of the princess' correspondence with Catherine II. On 26 October 1808, she sailed on the Maria, but this ship was wrecked leaving Wilmot to spend 8 days on the island of Stamieux, near Hamina, Finland. The passengers and crew then had to wait out a storm for three weeks on Aspo island. She reached Harwich, England on 26 December 1808, and Cork by 1809.

== Return from Russia ==
Wilmot toured the southwest of Ireland the following summer, and was presented at the lord lieutenant's court in Dublin Castle in 1810. There she met the future Lady Morgan, Sydney Owenson, author of The Wild Irish Girl. She moved to live with her parents in Clifton, Derbyshire in 1810 and married Rev. William Bradford in 1812. The couple had one son and two daughters, living at Sussex Downs, Storrington. She travelled to France with Katherine in 1817, and visited her at Moulins in 1818. When her husband was appointed chaplain to the British embassy in Vienna, the family moved there in 1819. Living there for the next 10 years, they were friends with Charles William, the British ambassador, and his wife Frances Vane, Marchioness of Londonderry. From 1820 to 1821, Wilmot and her family toured Italy, with her diaries of the period held in the Royal Irish Academy (RIA). The family returned to Storrington in 1829 when her husband was appointed chaplain-in-ordinary to King George IV.

In 1840, Wilmot's edition of Dashkova's memoirs were published in English, in two volumes, as Memoirs of the Princess Daschkaw, lady of honour to Catherine II, empress of all the Russias, written by herself: comprising letters of the empress, and other correspondence. Wilmot had delayed the publication due to strenuous opposition from Semyon (Simon) Vorontsov, Dashkova's brother, who for twenty years was Russian ambassador to Britain. This volume was based on Wilmot's transcript and her sister's translation, and is an edited and condensed version of the original. It was later translated into French, German, Russian and Czech.

== Later life and death ==
Wilmot returned to Ireland after the death of her husband in 1857, and lived with her daughter, Catherine, at Taney Hill house, Dublin. She died there on 18 December 1873, and is buried in Storrington churchyard in England. Wilmot and her sister's diaries were edited and published H. Montgomery Hyde and the Marchioness of Londonderry as The Russian journals of Martha and Catherine Wilmot in 1934, from the original letters, notes, and diaries held by the RIA. The following year they edited and published More letters from Martha Wilmot: impressions of Vienna, 1819–1829. The RIA hold her papers, including some unpublished material. Wilmot's daughter donated the manuscript of the transcription of Dashkova's memoirs, including revisions from the princess, to the British Museum library. This manuscript was used for a new translation by Kyril Fitzlyon (husband of April FitzLyon) in 1958. Another copy of an earlier draft of the manuscript, in Wilmot's handwriting, is held in St. Petersburg.
