= Elisheva Baumgarten =

Israeli academic

Elisheva Baumgarten (Hebrew: אלישבע באומגרטן) is the Yitzchak Becker Professor of Jewish Studies at the Hebrew University of Jerusalem. She is an expert on the social and religious history of the Jews of medieval northern Europe (1000-1400). Her research includes those who did not write the sources that have been transmitted, focusing particularly on women and gender hierarchies.

== Education ==
Baumgarten received her PhD from the Hebrew University of Jerusalem in 2001. Her doctoral thesis was entitled אמהות וילדים בחברה היהודית בימי הביניים (Mothers and Children: the Medieval Jewish Experience).

== Research ==
Baumgarten has written and edited several books, most notably Biblical Women and Jewish Daily Life in the Middle Ages (2022), Practicing Piety: Religious Observance and Daily Life in the Medieval Jewish Communities of Northern Europe (2016) and Mothers and Children: Jewish Family Life in Medieval Europe (2007). Her project, Beyond the Elite: Jewish Daily Life in Medieval Europe, was funded by the European Research Council (2016–2022). It explores what daily life was like for the Jews of northern France and Germany (Ashkenaz) from 1100 to 1350.

Baumgarten has received awards and fellowships from the Katz Center for Advanced Judaic Studies at the University of Pennsylvania, the Institute for Advanced Study in Princeton and the Institute for Advanced Studies in Jerusalem. She was the recipient of the 2016 Michael Bruno Memorial Award for outstanding Israeli researchers. She has received research grants from the Israel Science Foundation, the Israel Academy of Sciences and Humanities, the European Research Council, and the German-Israel Foundation.

== Bibliography ==
- Biblical Women and Jewish Daily Life in the Middle Ages (Philadelphia: University of Pennsylvania Press, 2022)
- (ed. with Ruth Mazo Karras and Katelyn Mesler) Entangled Histories: Knowledge, Authority, and Jewish Culture in the Thirteenth Century (Philadelphia: University of Pennsylvania Press, 2017)
- Practicing Piety: Religious Observance and Daily Life in the Medieval Jewish Communities of Northern Europe (University of Pennsylvania Press, 2016)
- Mothers and Children: Jewish Family Life in Medieval Europe (Princeton University Press, 2007)
