= Euphan Maxwell =

- Born: Euphan Montgomerie Maxwell; 1887
- Died: 1964 (aged 76–77); Kent, England
- Citizenship: Ireland
- Occupation: Ophthalmologist

Euphan Maxwell (1887–1964) was an Irish ophthalmologist and the first woman ophthalmic surgeon in Ireland at the Royal Victoria Eye and Ear Hospital, Dublin.

== Life and education ==
Euphan Montgomerie Maxwell was born in 1887, the daughter of Dr Patrick William Maxwell and Elizabeth Maxwell née Suckling. Her sister was the historian Constantia Maxwell, whom she lived with throughout her life at the family home at 19 Lower Baggot Street. Maxwell studied medicine and surgery at Trinity College Dublin, going on to be appointed a Fellow of the Royal College of Surgeons in Ireland (RCSI). Both sisters were among the first women to attend the college as students. Maxwell was one of the founding members of the Elizabethan Society in 1904, a society for the female students of the college.

Maxwell died in Kent, England in 1964 and is buried in Cranbrook, Tunbridge Wells.

== Career ==
Maxwell became the Assistant Surgeon and Pathologist at the Royal Victoria Eye and Ear Hospital, Dublin in 1912 at age 25. She held this position until her retirement in 1957. She also served as honorary secretary of the British Medical Section of Ophthalmology. Maxwell attended some of those wounded during the Easter 1916 Rising in Dublin, working at a temporary hospital at 40 Merrion Square East. Her participation in these events was featured as part of the RCSI exhibition to mark the centenary of the 1916 Rising in 2016.

During World War I, Maxwell became one of the first seven women to serve in the Royal Army Medical Corps in 1916. She went on to be deployed to Malta to the Ophthalmic Department St George's Hospital in August 1916. She resigned and left in 1917 to return to Dublin due to her father falling ill. She delivered the inaugural lecture established in his memory, the Montgomery Lectureship in Ophthalmology. Maxwell was one of the founding members of the Irish Ophthalmologic Society, elected the society's president from 1939 to 1941. She served as an examiner in Ophthalmology at the RCSI.

Maxwell was a member of the short-lived Irish Centre Party, sitting on its Provisional General Committee.
