= William Edward Hartpole Lecky =

Irish politician, historian and essayist (1838–1903)

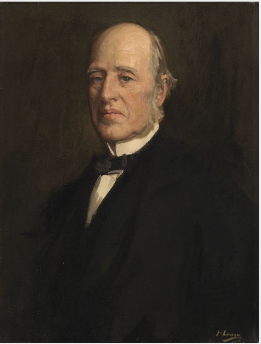
- Portrait by John Lavery, c. 1903

Member of Parliament for Dublin University
- In office 29 May 1895 – 22 October 1903
- Preceded by: David Plunket
- Succeeded by: James Campbell

Personal details
- Born: William Edward Hartpole Lecky; 26 March 1838 Newtown Park, Dublin, Ireland
- Died: 22 October 1903 (aged 65) Westminster, London, England
- Spouse(s): Elizabeth van Dedem (m. 1871; d. 1903)
- Education: Trinity College Dublin (B.A., 1859; M.A. 1863)

William Edward Hartpole Lecky, OM, PC, FBA (26 March 1838 – 22 October 1903) was an Irish historian, essayist, and political theorist with Whig proclivities. His major work was an eight-volume History of England during the Eighteenth Century.

== Early life ==
Born at Newtown Park, Stillorgan, Dublin, he was the eldest son of John Hartpole Lecky, a landowner. He was educated at Kingstown, Armagh, at Cheltenham College, and at Trinity College Dublin, where he graduated with a BA in 1859 and MA in 1863, and where he studied divinity with a view to becoming a priest in the Church of Ireland.

== Career ==
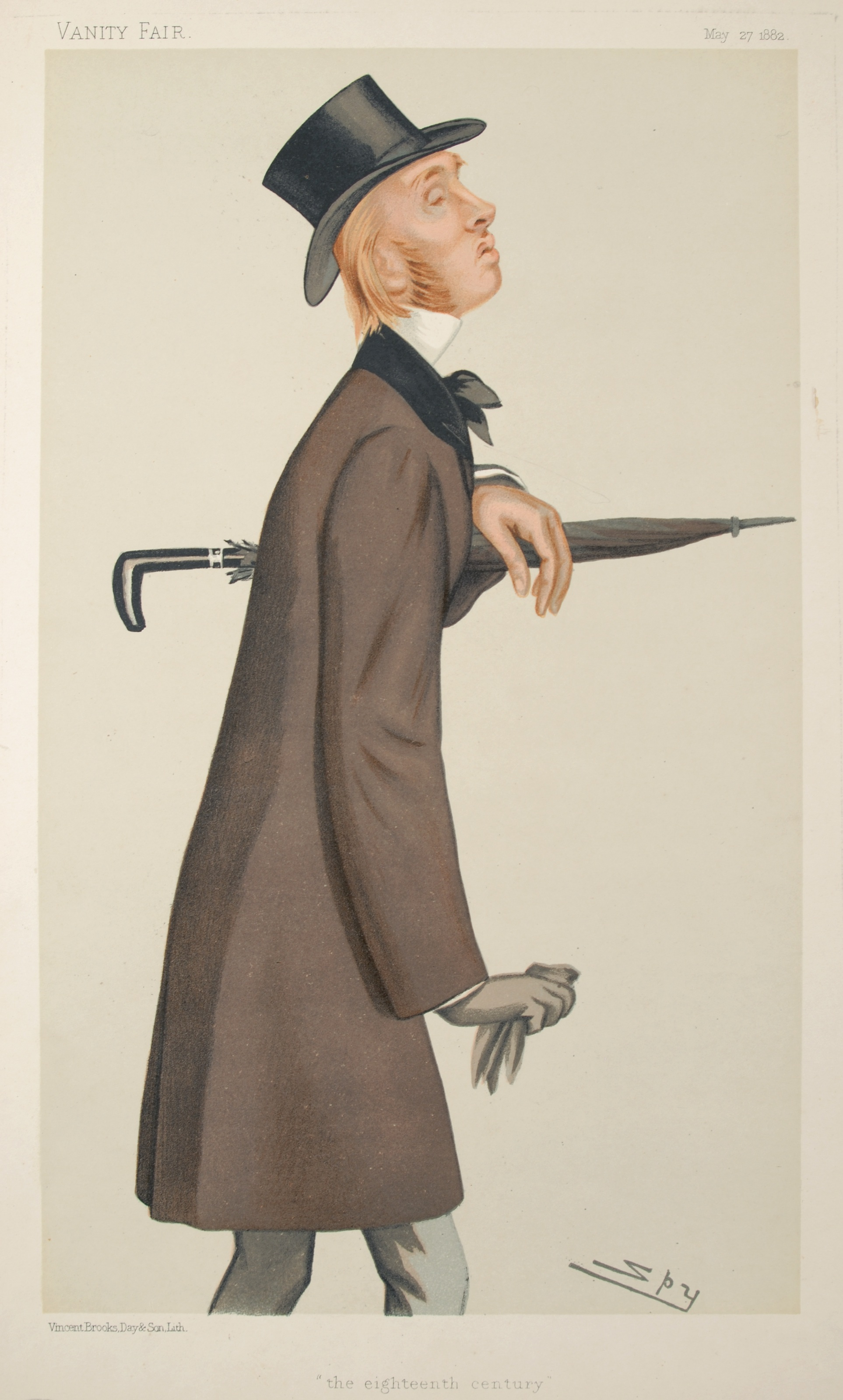
Caricature by Spy published in Vanity Fair in 1882.

In 1860, Lecky published anonymously a small book entitled The Religious Tendencies of the Age, but on leaving college he turned to historiography. In 1861, he published Leaders of Public Opinion in Ireland, containing brief sketches of Jonathan Swift, Henry Flood, Henry Grattan and Daniel O'Connell, originally anonymous, republished in 1871; the essay on Swift, rewritten and amplified, appeared again in 1897 as an introduction to an edition of Swift's works. Two surveys followed: A History of the Rise and Influence of Rationalism in Europe (2 vols., 1865), and A History of European Morals from Augustus to Charlemagne (2 vols., 1869). The latter aroused criticism, with its opening dissertation on "the natural history of morals." Lecky's History of European Morals was one of Mark Twain's favorite books, and influenced the writing of A Connecticut Yankee in King Arthur's Court.

Lecky then concentrated on his major work, A History of England during the Eighteenth Century, Vols. i. and ii. of which appeared in 1878, Vols. v. and vi in 1887, and Vols. vii. and viii., which completed the work, in 1890. In the "cabinet" edition of 1892, in 12 volumes (later reprinted), A History of Ireland in the Eighteenth Century is separated out.

A volume of Poems (1891) was less successful. In 1896, he published two volumes entitled Democracy and Liberty, in which he considered modern democracy. The pessimistic conclusions at which he arrived provoked criticism in both the United Kingdom and the United States of America, which was renewed when he published in a new edition (1899) his low estimate of William Ewart Gladstone, then recently dead.

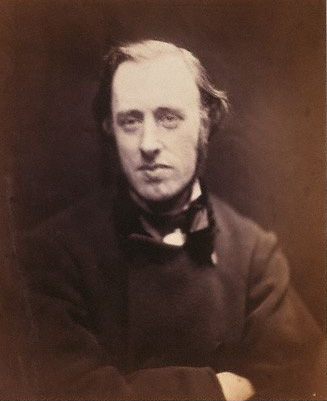
William Edward Hartpole Lecky, Photography 1868 by Julia Margaret Cameron, National Portrait Gallery London

In The Map of Life (1899) Lecky discussed in a popular style ethical problems of everyday life. In 1903, he published a revised and enlarged edition of Leaders of Public Opinion in Ireland, in two volumes, with the essay on Swift omitted and that on O'Connell expanded into a complete biography. A critic of the methods by which the Act of Union was passed, Lecky, who grew up as a moderate Liberal, was opposed to Gladstone's policy of Home Rule, and in 1895, he was elected a member of parliament as a Liberal Unionist from the Dublin University in a by-election. In 1897, he was made a privy councillor. In the 1902 Coronation Honours list published on 26 June 1902, he was nominated an original member of the new Order of Merit (OM), and he was invested as such by King Edward VII at Buckingham Palace on 24 October 1902. Due to ill.health, he stepped down from parliament with the appointment as Steward of the Chilten Hundreds in February 1903, and died later the same year.

== Degrees ==
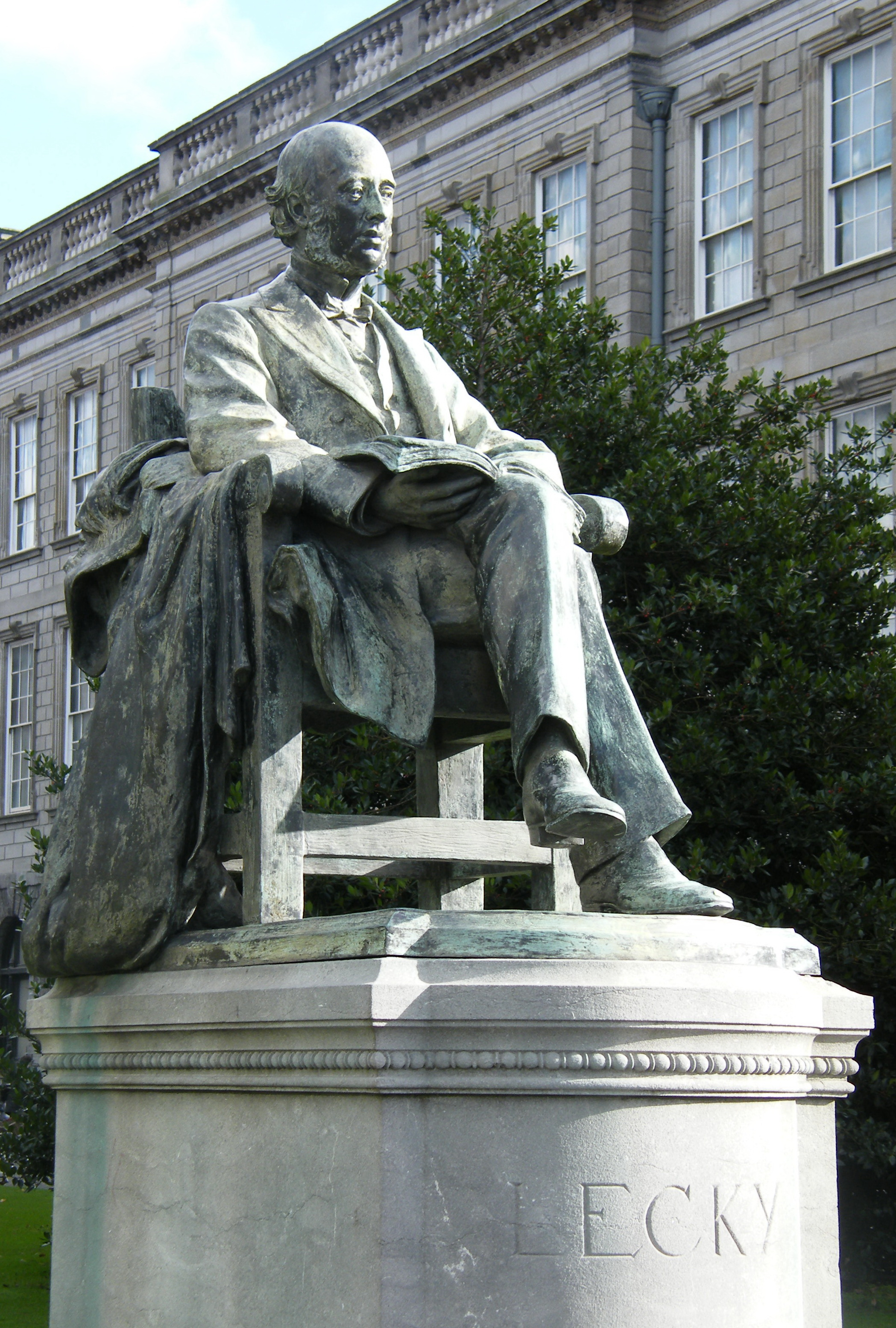
His statue at Trinity College Dublin

His university honours included the degree of LL.D. from Dublin, St Andrews and Glasgow, the degree of D.C.L. from Oxford and the degree of Litt.D. from Cambridge. In 1894, he was elected corresponding member of the Institute of France. He contributed occasionally to periodical literature, and two of his addresses, The Political Value of History (1892) and The Empire, its Value and its Growth (1893), were published.

== Family and posthumous recognition ==
After his father died when Lecky was 14, he was raised as a member of the family of the 8th Earl of Carnwath, his stepmother's husband.

He was married in 1871 to Elizabeth van Dedem, a lady-in-waiting to Queen Sophie of the Netherlands and member of the aristocratic van Dedem family. The couple had no children. Elizabeth, herself a writer and historian, contributed articles, chiefly on historical and political subjects, to various reviews.

In 1904, money for a memorial was raised by subscription and a statue by Goscombe John was erected in Trinity College Dublin.

A volume of Lecky's Historical and Political Essays was published posthumously (London, 1908), edited and introduced by his wife.

The Lecky Chair of History at Trinity College Dublin, was endowed by his widow in 1913.

One of the constituent libraries of Trinity College Dublin is also named in his honour, along with that of the Berkeley and Ussher libraries.

In 1978, part of the college's humanities library complex was named in his honour.

== Learned societies ==
Lecky was elected a member of the American Antiquarian Society in 1891.

== Bibliography ==
- History of the Rise and Influence of the Spirit of Rationalism in Europe (1865): online
- History of European Morals from Augustus to Charlemagne (1869): volume one of two; volume two of two
- The Leaders of Public Opinion in Ireland: Swift, Flood, Grattan, O'Connell (1871, revised ed.)
- A History of England in the Eighteenth Century (1878 in 8 volumes, revised 1892 in 7 volumes): online edition volume 1; volume 8
  - A History of England in the Eighteenth Century (1888–1890) (8 rare original volume set in private collection from the estate of Eleanor Silliman Belknap Humphrey). New York: D. Appleton and Company, 1,3, and 5 Bond Street).Includes all chapters, Preface, Bibliography, and Index.
- Lecky, William Edward Hartpole (1892), The political value of history (1st ed.), London: Edward Arnold, Wikidata Q73875725
- A History of Ireland in the Eighteenth Century (1892 in 5 volumes)
- "Democracy and Liberty" (1896)
- Map of Life (1899): online
- Introduction to Edward Gibbon's The History of the Decline and Fall of the Roman Empire (1906): online
- Historical and Political Essays (1908): online; gutenberg online
- Advertisement in New York Times seeking subscriptions to Lecky's Memorial Fund (9 July 1904): facsimile

== Notes ==
Parliament of the United Kingdom
Preceded by D. R. Plunket and Edward Carson	Member of Parliament for Dublin University; 1895–1903; With: Edward Carson	Succeeded by J. H. M. Campbell and Edward Carson
