= Wilmot Henry Bradford =

British Army officer (1815–1914)

General Wilmot Henry Bradford
- Born: c. 1815; Storrington, Sussex, England
- Died: 14 March 1914 (aged 98–99); Bournemouth, England
- Military career
- Allegiance: United Kingdom
- Branch: British Army
- Service years: 1833–1881
- Rank: Honorary general

General Wilmot Henry Bradford (c. 1815 – 14 March 1914) was a senior officer in the British Army.

He was born the son of William Bradford, Rector of Storrington, Sussex and educated at Eton College. His mother was the Irish traveller and writer Martha Wilmot, sister of Katherine Wilmot.

He entered the British Army as an ensign in 1833 and spent much of his career in Canada. He commanded a battalion of the Rifle Brigade in the Crimea at the battle of Alma and the siege of Sebastopol and subsequently commanded The Royal Canadian Rifle Regiment. He was promoted major-general in 1868 and lieutenant-general in 1877.

He was placed on the retired list as an honorary general in July 1881. In 1886, he was given the Colonelcy of the Royal Irish Rifles, which he held until his death in 1914.

He died at his home in Bournemouth in his 100th year known as the "Father of the Army". He had married Agnes Elizabeth Skeffington in 1903.
