= Kyril Zinovieff =

Russian author and literary translator

Kyril Lvovich Zinovieff (aka Kyril FitzLyon; Russian: Кирилл Львович Зиновьев; 1910–2015) was a Russian emigré, civil servant, author and literary translator.

== Biography ==
He was born in St Petersburg into an elite family of Tsarist Russia, with blood ties to Avram Gannibal, Count Orlov and the poet Lydia Zinovieva-Annibal. The Zinovieffs went into exile following the October Revolution, the young Kyril having witnessed its effects first-hand in St Petersburg. They travelled first to the Zinovieff family estate in Estonia, and then in 1920 to permanent exile in London. Kyril studied at St Paul’s School, followed by a degree from the LSE. He changed his name to Kyril FitzLyon during World War II at the prompting of his employer, the Foreign Office. He did war service in Egypt, Iraq and Persia. After the war, he worked in military intelligence.

He was the author of the illustrated volume Before the Revolution (co-author Tatiana Browning, 1983). He was a translator of note; among his translations were the memoirs of Princess Yekaterina Romanovna Dashkova and the diaries of Vaslav Nijinsky. With his second wife Jenny Hughes, he wrote The Companion Guide to St Petersburg and translated Russian literary classics such as Anna Karenina and Hadji Murat by Tolstoy and Notes from Underground and Winter Notes on Summer Impressions by Dostoyevsky.

== Personal life ==
Kyril was the youngest of four siblings. One sister Elena was also a centenarian; she died in 2013 aged 104. He married April Mead, later known as the author April FitzLyon, during the war in 1941. April died in 1998. Kyril re-married, his second wife Jenny Hughes being an old family friend.

He is buried in Chiswick New Cemetery.
