= History of marriage =

The history of marriage is a branch of social history that concerns the sociocultural evolution of socially or legally recognized unions between people called spouses, from prehistoric to modern times. Research on the history of marriage crosses disciplines and cultures, aiming to understand the structure and function of the family from many viewpoints. The study of history has shown that marriage, like other family systems, is flexible, culturally diverse and adaptive to ecological and economical conditions.

The history of marriage is often considered under history of the family or legal history.

== Prehistory ==
Marriage likely originated among Stone Age humans as a way to organize childrearing and daily work. While the theory of a male provider — who hunted for and protected his wife and children — has largely been dismissed by modern anthropologists, there was a division of labor between early men and women. Nursing women were much less capable of hunting large game, and instead focused on gathering and processing plants and smaller game (contributing the vast majority of a clan's food). This specialization led to greater interdependence between males and females, and as techniques became more advanced, it took longer to teach them to children, incentivizing parents to stay together longer. Still, the nuclear family was not the defining social institution — no individual family had enough resources to be independent, so larger clans were crucial for a family's survival. Likewise, unmarried women did not lack the support of their community. Marriages outside of immediate clan groups also allowed bands to forge relationships with one another by way of children who had parental ties to both groups. Smaller family groups would sometimes split off from their band and later join up with another.

As societies began to develop larger surpluses, and began to settle into more agrarian, sedentary structures, marriage became more important. Wealthier families became less interested in sharing resources, and instead began to use marriage as a tool to consolidate those resources within the family or between a few closely linked kin groups. Studies of genetic material have shown that endogamy became increasingly common among wealthier families.

== Ancient world ==
As wealthy families accumulated more and more resources, and people were subject to more taxation, inheritance rights became of greater concern, and marriage came to play an important role in many ancient societies. Marriage became one of the best ways for people to climb the income ladder and recruit economic partners. Both men and women came under more pressure from families to choose the "correct" spouse for the family's interests. The earliest written records show that by the time writing was invented, marriage became the way most wealth and land changed hands. Nevertheless, marriages were typically private affairs and ancient governments rarely got involved.

With larger amounts of wealth at stake, the distinction between "legitimate" and "illegitimate" children grew sharper. Because women had the unique ability to bear a child with an "impure" bloodline, generally their sexual behavior was more strictly supervised, especially among the aristocracy. Some societies developed elaborate ideas about female sexual purity, or forced illegitimate children into exile or slavery. In some cases, wealthy families resorted to marrying cousins or siblings to keep wealth in the family.

Among the working class, children were still vitally important as a workforce. As economies shifted toward agriculture, families needed larger numbers of children to handle their workloads. Infertile women were often cast aside.

The invention of the plow widened the division of labor between men and women. Plowing required greater physical strength and was less compatible with childcare, and therefore became associated with male labor. The belief, therefore, that men contributed more to a household's resources led to the proliferation of the dowry. The increase in warfare between emerging societies also raised men and lowered women in the social hierarchy — devaluing women and contributing to the idea that their presence in a family needed to be compensated in some way. Over time, in many societies, women became seen as the properties of their fathers or husbands. Where women could no longer choose their own mates, men now needed to win over their fathers.

Among the aristocracy, marriage became the site of political intrigue. Rulers typically used their ancestry to support their claims to their respective thrones, so legitimacy was crucial. Factions of ruling circles fought over who had the right to legitimize marriage and bloodlines — arguments which often had serious historical ramifications. Marriages — often temporary — were used to codify treaties and solidify relationships between different cities and even empires. Heads of state would often ratify treaties or trade deals with a marriage; those daughters in turn were expected to represent their fathers' interests in their new families. Wealthy men often had multiple wives (and occasionally, powerful women would have multiple husbands) to expand their influence, but this also risked producing many competing heirs. Women would plot to overthrow their own husbands or sons-in-law in order to install their own male relatives to power, and sometimes wielded significant influence over their own men. Wives sometimes killed other wives or their children, out of jealousy or fear of losing influence.

Generally, slaves were forbidden from having their own wives or households.

=== Africa ===
==== Ancient Egypt ====
The primary purpose of marriage was to have more children and descendants of the family, and to legitimize inheritance rights. Marriages were typically arranged by parents.

Among commoners, marriages were typically informal affairs. A couple was considered married once they had established a household together, and marriage did not require any special license or state approval. Propertied families, however, typically drew up prenuptial contracts for their own benefit.

Among the lower classes, husbands and wives worked together to manage businesses. Among the upper classes, women usually did not work outside the home, and instead supervised the servants of the household and their children's education.

Generally, women made more family decisions and controlled more of the home than in other ancient societies. Women had control over most of their property and could serve as legal persons who brought cases to court. Men who married higher-status women often were forced to yield to significant pressure from their wives and fathers-in-law. Even pharaohs frequently found themselves under the control of their mothers. Widows gained more legal freedom after their husbands' deaths—notably, the ability to buy and sell land.

Marriage for pharaohs was a more politically treacherous affair. Pharaohs often had multiple wives, and upper-class men would often marry off their female relatives to pharaohs to solidify connections with the royal family and represent their interests. In-laws frequently fought over inheritance rights. To curb this, early pharaohs sometimes married their sisters or half-sisters; the heir's legitimacy was then perceived as essentially doubled. Other pharaohs purposely married the female relatives of previous rulers, proclaiming they were married to gods. In the eighth century BCE, one pharaoh revived an older practice of the "Divine Wife"—elevating a pharaoh's daughter to become a priestess committed to celibacy.

Although it was possible to divorce, it was difficult. Men often divorced their wives if they were unable to reproduce. After about 365 B.C, divorce laws strongly favored women.

At first, marriages in ancient Egypt were usually exclusive, but it also was not uncommon for a man of high economic status to have more than one wife, especially if his first wife was unable to have children of her own. After Alexander of Macedonia's empire broke apart late in the fourth century BCE, during the Seleucid and Ptolemaic dynasties, polygamy became more widespread in an effort to help kings establish more alliances.

=== Europe ===
Roman historian Tacitus' research (which was conducted entirely through secondary sources) indicated that among ancient Germanic tribes, the bride and groom were roughly the same age and generally older than their Roman counterparts:

The youths partake late of the pleasures of love, and hence pass the age of puberty unexhausted: nor are the virgins hurried into marriage; the same maturity, the same full growth is required: the sexes unite equally matched and robust, and the children inherit the vigor of their parents.

The Visigothic Code of law in the 7th century placed the prime of life at 20 years for both men and women. states that ancient Germanic brides were on average about 20 and were roughly the same age as their husbands. In addition, Anglo-Saxon women, like those of other Germanic tribes, are marked as women from the age of 12 and older, based on archaeological finds, implying that the age of marriage coincided with puberty.

==== Ancient Greece ====
In the early years of ancient Greece, family ties were the primary way in which social life was organized. Marriages required no state intervention – only mutual agreement and the fact that the couple must regard each other as husband and wife accordingly. Marriage was primarily an economic arrangement, and romance had little to do with mate choice. One Greek orator in the fourth century BCE said, "We have [courtesans] for pleasure, concubines for the daily care of our body, but wives to bear us legitimate children and to be the trusted guardians of our household." The truest form of love was believed to be between an adult man and a much younger boy.

As Athenian reformers pushed for more robust government to prevent families from gaining too much power (as they were in city-states outside of Athens), they began to enact laws governing everyday life—including marriage. Legislation dictated that only children born of a state-sanctioned marriage could claim inheritance rights. Wills were invented to ensure property went to the preferred heir after death. Plato advocated for abolishing the family altogether to ensure people were truly loyal to the state.

Athenian leaders curbed the power of extended families by cutting wives off not just from their parents, but the larger world. Women were expected to take care of the house and bear children. In wealthier families, this was taken to an extreme—women were not allowed out of their homes and inner courtyards. This also became a sign of wealth, indicating that a family had enough money that their women did not need to lift a finger. In other cases, aristocratic women were allowed out in the company of male relatives. However, lower-class women continued to work as laundresses, seamstresses, bakers, and innkeepers.

Married Greek women had few rights in ancient Greek society and were effectively seen as property. Mothers were not considered the true parents of their own children, but vessels for their husband's seed. Under Athenian law, a man's seduction of another's wife was punishable by death, but the rape of another man's wife merited only a monetary fine—the rationale being that a lover posed more of a threat to the husband's property than a rapist, whom the wife was likely to despise. When Greek husbands eulogized their departed wives, they typically praised their "self-control" above any other personality traits. Men were expected to maintain disciplinary control over their wives. Husbands had unilateral right to divorce (though if the divorce was ruled unfair, he faced a monetary penalty). Even after their husbands' deaths, a woman's sons gained the authority to act on her behalf. A woman whose father died without male heirs could be forced to marry her nearest male relative – even if she had to divorce her husband first.

Men usually married when they were in their 20s and women in their teens.

==== Roman Republic (509 - 31 BCE) ====
Marriages were largely economic affairs, with inheritance rights at the center of the institution. While marrying into a more influential family could increase one's influence, Rome had a strong central government and individual families had less political influence than in other classical civilizations. Romans were very concerned about their wives birthing illegitimate children who might lay claim to their wealth. Men, however, philandered frequently.

Marriage contracts themselves were very casual, often only requiring a "marital attitude" on the part of the couple. Divorce was very common in Ancient Rome, and often performed very casually whenever circumstances made the end of a union sensible. There is some evidence that in the early years of the Republic, only men had the right to initiate divorce. But by the later Republic, both men and women could seek divorce. There were cases where men traded wives, essentially as gifts of friendship.

There were multiple types of marriages in ancient Roman society. In the traditional ("conventional") form called conventio in manum, a woman lost her family rights of inheritance and of her old family and gained them with her new one. She now was subject to the authority of her husband and he gained control of all her possessions. This type of marriage sometimes required a ceremony with witnesses, but among commoners was sometimes a much more informal affair, wherein a couple was considered married once they began living together. Approval from one's father was always required.

Under the free marriage known as sine manu, the wife remained a member of her original family; she stayed under the authority of her father, kept her family rights of inheritance with her old family and did not gain any with the new family. Because fathers typically died before husbands, women in these marriages were more likely to gain legal independence earlier in their lives.

Men also maintained ultimate authority over their children, including after divorces. Common belief was that children were brought into a family to serve their father and existed only by his permission. Fathers had the right to abandon their children to die or give them up for adoption.

In the early republic, husbands paid bridewealth to brides' families. By the third century BCE, however, dowries were the standard. Husbands controlled a wife's dowry, but had to return it in cases of divorce where the bride was not at fault for the divorce.

Roman men tended to be more friendly with their wives than Greek husbands. Husbands and wives often socialized together. Public displays of affection like kissing, however, were generally considered boorish or even disgraceful.

Slaves and prostitutes were generally not allowed to marry. Men typically married in their late twenties or early thirties, while women generally married in their teens. The minimum age of marriage for girls was 12.

In the later years of the Republic, as more and more men went off to war, the marriage rate dwindled. Wives whose husbands were not around had greater freedom than in other societies of this era, and many would act as head of their households, accumulating wealth and political influence for themselves.

==== Pre-Christian Roman Empire (27 BCE - 391 CE) ====
The first Roman emperor, Augustus, launched a campaign to reform Roman family life and boost the birth rate. Husbands were legally mandated to divorce wives who committed adultery, which became a criminal offense punishable by banishment. He limited inheritance rights for unmarried people and married people without children. Applicants for political office who were married with children were given preferential treatment. Women with three or more children could attain legal independence from husbands and fathers. However, women and their husbands continued to limit the number of children they bore through birth control and abandoning infants.

Marriage remained a relatively casual affair, and Augustus did not attempt to limit divorce. Both men and women could initiate divorce.

==== Post-Christian Europe ====
From the early Christian era (30 to 325 CE), marriage was thought of as primarily a private matter, with no uniform religious or other ceremony being required. Early Christianity displayed an unprecedented hostility to family obligations. Church leaders begrudgingly accepted marriage as an alternative to uncontrolled lust. But doctrine insisted that familial ties should come second to spirituality.

However, under the reign of emperor Theodosius, Christianity became the official religion of the Roman Empire, and the Catholic church began to take on "quasi- governmental functions as tax collectors, record keepers, and legal representatives of the state".

Some Christian emperors attempted, without much success, to limit divorce rights, claiming divorce was an affront to God's plan. Divorce could still be initiated by both men and women.

After the Roman Empire collapsed, the Catholic church was the only functioning bureaucracy that could handle record-keeping, collecting taxes, and writing laws. The church became the authority on marriage.

=== Far East ===
==== Ancient China ====
The mythological origin of Chinese marriage is a story about Nüwa and Fu Xi, whose marriage allowed them to create humanity.

Marriage in Ancient China was secondary to one's existing familial ties. Parents took a prominent role in arranging and overseeing marriages. Parents of men could force their sons to divorce for a variety of reasons (e.g., if they didn't like his wife's work ethic, if she wasn't bearing children, if they felt their son's attachment to his wife was a threat to his attachment to his birth family). Likewise, the ancient Chinese word for "romantic love" had a negative connotation and was often used to describe an illicit, unapproved relationship. Chinese writers discouraged women from confiding in her husband or even telling him about her day. A husband who showed open affection for his wife was seen as having weak character.

Sometimes, lowborn men who served the bureaucracy exceptionally well would be "awarded" a higher-born wife.

Endogamy was relatively common among all classes. Generally, only marriage to one's paternal — not maternal — relatives was thought of as incest. But people of the same surname were expected supposed to consult with their family trees prior to marriage to reduce the potential risk of unintentional incest through one's paternal line. This practice was enforced under the law.

Confucius defined a wife as “someone who submits to another.” A wife, according to Confucian philosophy, had to follow “the rule of the three obediences: while at home she obeys her father, after marriage she obeys her husband, after he dies she obeys her son.”

Concubines and "backup wives" (a wife's sisters who would take up residence in case their services were needed) were common. Parents could force their son to take a concubine if his wife was not producing viable heirs. Many imperial princesses, however, were exempt from these rules and their power thoroughly overshadowed their husbands. One Chinese princess was allowed a harem of over thirty male concubines.

Women and men were married relatively young in Ancient China. For the women, it was soon after puberty and men were expected to marry around age twenty.

==== Classical India ====
According to Hindu tradition, marrying was a holy act, and an unmarried person was considered impious. In some cases, unmarried people were ineligible to participate in religious ceremonies.

It was thought that one's daughter is only temporary, and that she was meant to be her husband's. The main duty of a girl's parents was to arrange her marriage and provide a dowry (an insufficient dowry could be seen as an insult). After marriage, a woman became part of her husband's home, and was a guest in her birth family's home. Wives were expected to serve their husbands.

Falling in romantic love before marriage was generally seen as disruptive or even antisocial.

=== Near & Middle East ===
The first recorded evidence of marriage ceremonies uniting a man and a woman dates back to approximately 2350 BC, in ancient Mesopotamia. Wedding ceremonies, as well as dowry and divorce, can be traced back to Mesopotamia and Babylonia.

There were several types of marriages, used for various purposes. A mut'ah (or temporary marriage) created a sexual outlet for men and women under certain circumstances (in particular, travel) without subjecting them to the otherwise harsh penalties for nonmarital sex. These temporary marriages did not themselves create any obligation between the spouses; however, if a child was born of the union, the child was considered legitimate and had inheritance rights. Early nomadic communities in the Middle East practiced a form of marriage known as beena, in which a wife would own a tent of her own, within which she retains complete independence from her husband.

By the second millennium B.C., women were generally expected to be subordinate to their husbands. The practice of secluding women in special quarters to guard their chastity became widespread in the Middle East; it was also a way to signify that a family's wealth was great enough that their daughters and wives did not need to work. In many states, only men were allowed to initiate divorce.

==== Sumer (c. 3300 – c. 1900 BC) ====
Marriages were usually arranged by the parents of the bride and groom; engagements were usually completed through the approval of contracts recorded on clay tablets. These marriages became legal as soon as the groom delivered a bridal gift to his bride's father. The Sumerians considered it desirable for women to still be virgins at the time of marriage, but did not expect the same of men.

One Sumerian proverb describes the ideal, happy marriage, through the mouth of a husband, who boasts that his wife has borne him eight sons and is still eager to have sex.

Women were allowed to own property, transact business and had their rights protected by the courts. Sons and daughters inherited property on equal terms. However, the status of women deteriorated in the centuries after 2300 BC.

==== Babylon (1894–1595 BCE) ====
Hammurabi's Code codified rules about marriage and property inheritance. The code required that marriages be consummated and that wives remain loyal to their husbands. Infidelity was punishable by death. However, husbands were legally required to care for their wives economically, and women were legally protected if their husbands failed to do so. Women's dowries also belonged to them until they had sons to claim that inheritance. Men were allowed to see concubines and even take second wives under some circumstances, but their first wives were always held in higher authority than subsequent wives.

The right of divorce rested with men; however, a woman's children were her own responsibility after divorce. Divorced women were free to marry whomever they liked, or return to their father's households. Widows were also permitted to remarry with permission from a judge.

==== Hittites (c. 1700 – c. 1178 BCE) ====
Hittite Queens often were influential wielders of power in foreign policy, such as via establishment of marriage alliances.

==== Assyrian Empire ====
Generally, there was no legal distinction between men and women in the Old Assyrian period and they had more or less the same rights in society. Both men and women could inherit property, participated in trade, bought, owned, and sold houses and slaves, made their own last wills, and were allowed to divorce their partners. Bridal dowries belonged to the brides, not the husband, and it was inherited by her children after her death.

Despite their equal legal standing, women faced greater social expectations. Men generally worked as agricultural laborers or tradesmen, whereas wives were expected to provide their husbands with garments and food.

Although marriages were typically monogamous, husbands were allowed to buy a female slave in order to produce an heir if his wife was infertile—though wives had the right to choose the slave. Husbands who were away on long trading journeys were allowed to take a second wife in one of the trading colonies, although they were strictly expected to provide for their second wives.

Women's rights generally degraded during the Middle Assyrian period (1363 - 912 BCE). Women's bodies came to be regarded as the property of their fathers of husbands. Women's premarital chastity and post-marital loyalty were strictly supervised. Married women were required to wear veils, and married women who committed adultery could be sentenced to death. Men were given the right to punish their wives virtually however they saw fit. A raped woman could be forced to marry her rapist. However, it is not entirely clear how strictly these laws were enforced.

Widows were guaranteed special privileges during the Middle Assyrian period. Widows who did not have any sons or relatives to support them were guaranteed support from the government.

==== Hebrews ====
The Old Testament and later Jewish teachings called marriage God’s commandment and celebrated sexuality within marriage. According to ancient Hebrew tradition, a wife was seen as being property of high value and was, therefore, usually, carefully looked after. The Covenant Code orders "If he take him another; her food, her clothing, and her duty of marriage, shall he not diminish (or lessen)". The Talmud interprets this as a requirement for a man to provide food and clothing to, and have sex with, each of his wives.

As a polygynous society, the Israelites did not have any laws that imposed marital fidelity on men. Babylonian Jews allowed some men entering a new town to request a "wife for a day". These temporary marriages did not themselves create any obligation between the spouses; however, if a child was born of the union, the child was considered legitimate and had inheritance rights. Adulterous married women, adulterous betrothed women, and the men who slept with them, however, were subject to the death penalty by the biblical laws against adultery. The literary prophets indicate that adultery was a frequent occurrence, despite these legal strictness's.

== Middle Ages ==
=== East Asia ===
==== China ====
Chinese family loyalty continued to supersede marital ties. At some points, the law permitted a man's father raping his wife.

During the Ming period (1368–1644), marriage was considered solemn and according to the law written in the Ming Code, all commoners' marriages must follow the rules written in Duke Wen's Family Rules. Licensed marriage matchmakers played a key role in marriages. The rules stated that "in order to arrange a marriage, an agent must come and deliver messages between the two families." Sometimes both families were influential and wealthy and the matchmaker bonded the two families into powerful households. Marriage was key in increasing the strength of clans. Ming Dynasty emperors often married wives from the lower classes to curb prominent wives' families' ambitions and the problems those conflicting interests caused.

==== Japan ====
As in China, marriage matches in Japan were expected to serve the ie, or the larger family, by perpetuating the family line, adding new adults to the family's labor force, forming alliances with other families, and offloading female dependents. Almost all people were expected to marry and produce children. Marriage generally occurred between a small group of families of the same social class. When choosing spouses, families considered economic status and political views. Brides and grooms, and their families, were considered equals. Even after marriage, a husband remained under control of his father's family.

Romance in marriage was discouraged, as it was thought to undermine filial piety. According to one proverb, "Those who come together in passion stay together in tears." Sexual gratification was more acceptable outside of one's marriage, through concubines, geishas, or "pleasure districts".

During the Heian period (794–1185), court life flourished and upward mobility was one of the primary goals of marriage among the upper classes. Marriage did not necessarily need to be a permanent agreement. Aristocrats would exchange letters and poetry for a period of months or years before arranging to meet after dark. If a man saw the same woman for a period of three nights, they were considered married, and the wife's parents held a banquet for the couple. Typically, husbands arranged for their wives to move in with them in order to ensure legitimacy of their offspring. Some aristocratic wives, however, stayed in their fathers' homes.

High-ranking men sometimes kept multiple wives or concubines, and their children with these concubines were considered just as legitimate. There was language to separate wives from concubines, and distinguish between their respective children, but children of concubines were just as entitled to inheritance as children of wives.

==== Korea ====
The practice of matrilocality in Korea started in the Goguryeo period and ended in the early Joseon period. The Korean saying that when a man gets married, he is "entering jangga" (the house of his father-in-law), stems from the Goguryeo period.

=== Islamic World ===
Both Muslim writers in the Islamic world were more approving of sexual passion between husband and wife than prominent thinkers in Europe; too much intimacy, however, could be an affront to God. Secular writers, meanwhile, believed love thrived best outside of a marriage.

Islamic law allowed men four wives at one time, as well as a non-specified number of slave concubines.(Quran 4:3) Sexual relations between men and their female slaves were not defined as extramarital sex, and if the father chose to acknowledge the children he had with his slave-concubine, the child would be free and defined as if it had been born within marriage.

Sunni Muslims declared temporary mut'ah marriages unacceptable, though Shiite Muslims continued the practice.

=== Medieval Europe ===
Married life shifted in Northern and Western Europe in between the 14th and 17th centuries. The Black Plague weakened many feudal power structures, more and more people began moving into cities and working for wages instead of as peasants.

After the dissolution of the Roman Empire in 1453, the Catholic Church became the most powerful institution in much of Europe. However, the Church was initially hesitant to involve itself in marriage, viewing it as a necessary evil and the only alternative to extramarital procreation. There was no state involvement in marriage and personal status; instead, these issues were adjudicated in ecclesiastical courts. The early Church actively dissuaded young women from marrying, encouraging them instead to become nuns. With few local exceptions, until 1545, Christian marriages in Europe were by mutual consent, declaration of intention to marry and upon the subsequent physical union of the parties. The couple would promise verbally to each other that they would be married to each other; the presence of a priest or witnesses was not required. However, in practice, marriages were arranged by families and neighbors, sometimes as early as birth, and these early pledges to marry were often used to ensure treaties between different royal families, nobles, and heirs of fiefdoms.

Gradually, the Church began to get more invested in marriages. It began dictating age requirements, condemning incest, requiring a dowry, and advocating for free partner choice. In 1563 the Council of Trent decreed that a valid marriage must be performed by a priest before two witnesses. However, many of the Church's own rules were enforced arbitrarily.

Marriage continued to be a primarily economic arrangement in Medieval Europe. It was generally agreed upon that romantic passion had no place in a marriage. Most men could not run their farms or businesses alone, and needed a business partner and someone to assist with domestic household tasks. A wife's dowry was often the largest infusion of wealth a man would ever get. Wedding contracts were sometimes drafted between families without the name of one or both spouses. Wealthy families often tried to marry their children into noble ones. Aristocrats sometimes kept younger children from getting married in order to concentrate wealth in the hands of their heirs; monasteries and nuns became dumping grounds for younger siblings.

Unlike in other parts of the world, including Eastern and Southern Europe, spouses often moved away from extended family and established their own households. The working married couple became the new foundational unit of society. This requirement for self-sufficiency often required both partners to work before marriage to bring wealth into their new family. Some locales went as far as to forbid two impoverished people from getting married. It remained common in rural areas for neighbors to pitch in and provide capital to new married couples.

The average age at first marriage varied depending on local custom and economic concerns—in better times, more people could afford to marry earlier and thus fertility rose; conversely, marriages were delayed or forgone when times were bad, thus restricting family size. The average age of marriage for most of Northwestern Europe from 1500 to 1800 was around 25 years of age. Most brides were in their early twenties and most grooms two or three years older. However, a substantial number of men and women married for the first time in their thirties and forties, particularly in urban areas. The more involved requirements set by the Church made courtship a longer process.

With their own wealth to bring into a marriage, women in Northwestern Europe -- particularly those living in well-populated urban areas -- could be pickier about partner selection. However, parents were often still closely involved and local churches often honored parents' wishes over children's.

Once married, their resources belonged to their husbands. Medieval marriage advice books, proverbs and fairytales encouraged wive to be chaste, obedient, and hardworking. They often discouraged women from giving their husbands nicknames or otherwise being overly familiar. Men were advised to beat wives who did not obey, and when husbands failed to discipline their wives properly, their communities would shame them publicly. Many medieval songs mocked marital love as a form of weakness.

While wives often lacked economic freedom, inheritance rights for women were some of the strongest in the world. Upper-class widows often controlled great amounts of wealth.

Infidelity was common and even romanticized, especially for men, who were rarely discreet about their extramarital affairs.

Husbands and wives split domestic labor fairly evenly. Men often took care of the outdoor labor (plowing, fertilizing) while women often worked more indoors and cared for the animals. Wives of tradesmen often served as apprentices and took charge of the business side of their husbands' enterprises.

As the Church's influence grew, divorce became less and less permissible, eventually becoming some of the strictest in the world by the 14th century. Eventually, divorce was generally only allowed in cases of adultery, impotence, incest, or prior betrothal. The evidence required to prove any of these reasons varied, and at some points it was relatively easy to manufacture an excuse. When a spouse died, the surviving spouse typically remarried as quickly as possible, because they could not afford to be single.

Women began taking the surname of their husbands beginning around the 12th century.

==== Western Europe ====
Classical Celtic and Germanic cultures (which were not rigidly patriarchal) had a stronger influence in Western Europe and helped to offset the Judaeo-Roman patriarchal influence. Here, almost everyone was expected to marry, and earlier than in other parts of Europe (often in early adolescence). Marriage was viewed as the formal entrance into adulthood, and unmarried people were looked down upon.

For centuries, mutual intent and a blessing to marry was the only requirement for marriage, though various cultures also had their own traditions. In some places, feudal lords had a say in matchmaking.

No one kingdom in Western Europe was powerful enough to take on its neighboring rivals, so women were often "peace-weavers" and marriages were used to settle political disputes.

=== Pre-colonial Americas ===
Marriage practices varied greatly among indigenous groups in the pre-colonial Americas. Many indigenous groups recognized same-sex marriage, wherein one partner typically took on the role of the opposite sex.

Inuit families were known to have cospousal relationships, in which two sets of spouses freely had sexual relationships with each other's spouse. Expressing jealousy about these sexual relationships was generally frowned upon. Children of cospouses saw one another as siblings.

In the Nuxalk and the Kwakwaka'wakw societies of the Pacific Northwest, marriages were used entirely to establish connections between kin groups. Marriage contracts were sometimes drawn up to a person's dog or foot if no suitable human matches were available.

In traditional Hopi marriages, a woman's family paid a dowry in cornmeal to the groom's family.

In the northeast, individuals generally made their own marital decisions. Couples were freely allowed to part ways.

People in the Innu society enjoyed a lot of sexual freedom. Legitimacy of children was not much of a concern, because most things belonged to the entire tribe.

=== Pre-colonial Oceania ===
Among the Aborigines in Australia, marriage was strictly managed by elders. Girls were typically assigned a husband during their childhoods.

== Early Modern period ==
=== East Asia ===
==== Edo Japan (1600-1868) ====
By the Edo period, the expectations of filial loyalty during marriage had grown even stronger. The head of the household was responsible for arranging matches, and brides and grooms were expected not to even express a preference.

Even after an 1871 law abolished the legal caste system, class discrimination was alive and well in spouse selection.

==== Meiji Restoration (1868-1912) ====
Public education became almost universal between 1872 and the early 1900s, and schools stressed the traditional concept of filial piety, first toward the nation, second toward the household, and last of all toward a person's own private interests. Love was thought to be inessential to marriage. Marriage under the Meiji Civil Code required the permission of the head of a household and of the parents for men under 30 and women under 25.

In arranged marriages, most couples met beforehand at a formal introduction called an omiai (お見合い, lit. 'looking at one another'), although some would meet for the first time at the wedding ceremony. A visitor to Japan described the omiai as "a meeting at which the lovers (if persons unknown to each other may be so styled) are allowed to see, sometimes even to speak to each other, and thus estimate each others' merits." However, their objections carried little weight.

Courtship remained rare in Japan at this period. Boys and girls were separated in schools, in cinemas, and at social gatherings. Colleagues who began a romantic relationship could be dismissed. Parents sometimes staged an arranged marriage to legitimize a "love match," but many others resulted in separation and sometimes suicide.

Marriage, like other social institutions of this period, emphasized the subordinate inferiority of women to men. Women learned that as a daughter they ought to obey their father, as a wife their husband, as a widow their sons. Chastity in marriage was expected for women, and a law not repealed until 1908 allowed a husband to kill his wife and her lover if he found them in an adulterous act. The prostitution of women survived the periodic intrusion of puritanical ideals on Japan's less restrictive sexuality.

Divorce laws, however, became more equal over time. The laws of the early Meiji period established several grounds on which a man could divorce: sterility, adultery, disobedience to parents-in-law, loquacity, larceny, jealousy, and disease. A wife, accompanied by a close male relative, could appeal for divorce if she had been deserted or imprisoned by her husband, or if he was profligate or mentally ill. The 1898 Meiji Civil Code established the principle of mutual consent, although the consent of women was still likely to be forced until the early 20th century, as women gradually gained access to education and financial independence.

Marriage between a Japanese and non-Japanese person was not officially permitted until 14 March 1873. A foreign national was required to surrender their citizenship and acquire Japanese citizenship.

=== Europe ===
Marriage became a major dividing line of the conflicting values of Catholic and Protestant Christian traditions.

Protestants upheld marriage as the foundation of a strong moral society, and romanticized marriage and family rather than treating sex as a necessary evil. Protestant leaders discouraged monasteries and convents, instead urging religious leaders to marry, believing that otherwise they were likely to turn to sinful expressions of lust.

Protestant reformers did still enforce rules for marriage, cracking down on premarital sex in particular. As part of the Protestant Reformation, the role of recording marriages and setting the rules for marriage passed to the state, reflecting Martin Luther's view that marriage was a "worldly thing". John Calvin and his Protestant colleagues reformulated Christian marriage by enacting the Marriage Ordinance of Geneva, which imposed "Mandated parental consent, peer witness, church consecration, and state registration for valid marriage formation". By the 17th century, many of the Protestant European countries had a state involvement in marriage.

Conventional wisdom in Protestant communities was that, with effort, love would develop after a marriage.Marrying primarily for love was still discouraged — one saying claimed that "he who marries for love has good nights and bad days". People were generally suspicious of married couples who liked each other too much, and some theologians claimed those couples were committing the sin of idolatry.

As part of the Counter-Reformation, in 1563 the Council of Trent decreed that a Roman Catholic marriage would be recognized only if the marriage ceremony was officiated by a priest with two witnesses. The council also authorized a Catechism, issued in 1566, which defined marriage as "The conjugal union of man and woman, contracted between two qualified persons, which obliges them to live together throughout life."

==== England and Wales ====
In England and Wales, under the Anglican Church, marriage by consent and cohabitation was valid until the passage of the Marriage Act 1753. The act required a marriage ceremony to be officiated by an Anglican priest in the Anglican Church with two witnesses and registration. The act did not apply to Jewish marriages or those of Quakers, whose marriages continued to be governed by their own customs.

== Late Modern period ==
=== Europe ===
In the seventeenth century, a series of political, economic, and social changes rearranged marital priorities.

==== England and Wales ====
Since 1837, civil marriages have been recognized as a legal alternative to church marriages under the Marriage Act 1836. In Germany, civil marriages were recognized in 1875. This law permitted a declaration of the marriage before an official clerk of the civil administration, when both spouses affirm their will to marry, to constitute a legally recognized valid and effective marriage, and allowed an optional private clerical marriage ceremony.

== 20th century ==
=== China ===
The New Marriage Law of 1950 radically changed Chinese marriage traditions, enforcing monogamy, equality of men and women, and choice in marriage; arranged marriages were the most common type of marriage in China until then. Starting October 2003, it became legal to marry or divorce without authorization from the couple's work units.

=== Europe ===
By the 20th century, free choice of spouse was the norm in Western Europe.

In contemporary English common law, a marriage is a voluntary contract by a man and a woman, in which by agreement they choose to become husband and wife. Edvard Westermarck proposed that "the institution of marriage has probably developed out of a primeval habit".

Since the late twentieth century, major social changes in Western countries have led to changes in the demographics of marriage, with the age of first marriage increasing, fewer people marrying, and more couples choosing to cohabit rather than marry. For example, the number of marriages in Europe decreased by 30% from 1975 to 2005.
