= Society for Medieval Feminist Scholarship =

- Abbreviation: SMFS
- Formation: 1985; 41 years ago
- Fields: Medieval Studies, Women's Studies, Gender Studies
- Members: Melissa Ridley Elmes (President 2020-2021)
- Formerly called: Medieval Feminist Newsletter

The Society for Medieval Feminist Scholarship (SMFS) is an academic organization which "promotes the study of the Patristic Age, the Middle Ages, and the Early Modern era from the perspective of gender studies, women's studies, and feminist studies". Its development followed the rise of the study of medieval women in the 1970s and 1980s, and sought to increase the number of and sponsor papers about medieval women, and feminist theory driven scholarship, at the largest international medieval studies conferences, International Congress on Medieval Studies in Kalamazoo and Leeds IMC.

In 2007, the Society had over 1000 members from around the world.

== History ==
=== 1985 Medieval Feminist Newsletter ===
The origins of SMFS lay in the Medieval Feminist Newsletter, begun in 1985 by the organization's founders, Elizabeth Robertson, E. Jane Burns, and Roberta (Bonnie) Krueger, who were later joined by Thelma Fenster who organised the "Commentary Column", and assisted by Colleen Anderson who typed the first newsletters. The founders met at the airport after the 1985 International Medieval Congress at Kalamazoo, Michigan, where "few sessions had considered women and none had been feminist".

Robertson remembers that:

"The Newsletter sprang into being because of shared dissatisfaction - and the history of the Newsletter's foundations testifies to the fact that dissatisfaction and grumbling can be productive."

— Elizabeth Robertson, Medieval Feminist Forum, 42.5 (2006), p. 15

The Newsletter was the "first publication to consider the relationship between feminism and medieval studies". The Newsletter was illustrated with the image of a dragon chasing the Virgin Mary as she read a Book of Hours, which was drawn by Megan Brill to avoid copyright infringements.

=== 1992 Society for Medieval Feminist Scholarship ===
The group became SMFS in 1992, driven by a desire to establish more formal networks for communication, funding, and with a view to producing publications. Jacqueline Murray was the first president.

== Medieval Feminist Forum ==
Since 1999, SFMS has produced Medieval Feminist Forum, a peer-reviewed journal which became an online-only journal in 2009.

== Connections with other scholarly societies ==
The organization is affiliated with the MLA and the AHA and has sponsored sessions at annual meetings of these societies. SMFS has also sponsored sessions at other major international conferences, including the International Congress on Medieval Studies in Kalamazoo, the International Medieval Congress at the University of Leeds, the Medieval Academy of America's annual meeting, and the Australia & New Zealand Association for Medieval & Early Modern Studies.

The scholarly organisations and projects Feminist Art History Project and the Society for the Study of Homosexuality in the Middle Ages were founded following SMFS Kalamazoo meetings.

== Services and prizes ==
SMFS provides a Mentoring Exchange at most major conferences where it has a presence. It also awards several annual prizes, including one for the Best Graduate Essay, Best First Article of Feminist Scholarship on the Middle Ages, and Best First Book of Feminist Scholarship on the Middle Ages. It also manages a Listserv, MEDFEM-L.

In 2014, SMFS hosted a Wikipedia Write-In at the 49th Annual International Congress on Medieval Studies at Kalamazoo, where members were encouraged to contribute their time and expertise to adding and editing articles in their fields.

SMFS members contribute to the maintenance of the Feminae: Medieval Women and Gender Index, which is hosted by the University of Iowa.

SMFS is affiliated with the UK-based "GMS".and regularly sponsors sessions at the GMS annual conference.

== Notable SMFS Members ==
More about notable SMFS Members:

- Geraldine Heng
- Jacqueline Murray
- Jennifer Summitt
