= Katherine Wilmot =

Irish writer and traveller (c. 1773 – 1824)

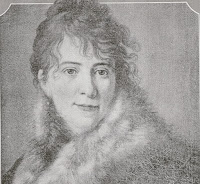
- Born: c. 1773; Drogheda, County Louth
- Died: 28 March 1824 (aged 52–53); Paris, France
- Occupation: Writer
- Writing career
- Period: 18th century

Katherine (or Catherine) Wilmot (c.1773 – 28 March 1824) was an Irish traveller and diarist. She made a Grand Tour from 1801 to 1803 and documented her experiences through letters, including encounters with notable figures like Napoleon Bonaparte. She later traveled to Russia to join her sister Martha Wilmot and lived there from 1805 to 1807. She later moved to France and died in Paris in 1824. Her writings, letters, and diaries provide insight on the Napoleonic era, on the Russian society and on travel in the 19th century. Her works also include her sister's transcript of the memoirs of Princess Dashkova.

== Life ==
Catherine Wilmot was born in Drogheda, County Louth, to Edward and Martha Wilmot (née Moore). She was the eldest daughter of six daughters and three sons. Her father was the port surveyor in Drogheda, having previously served as captain in the 40th Regiment of Foot. He was transferred to a similar post in County Cork in 1775, where Wilmot was raised. The family settled in Glanmire, near the seat of the Earl of Mountcashell in Moore Park. The earl's family used the surname Moore.

Wilmot was friendly with Lady Mountcashell, formerly Margaret King, an early and eager pupil of Mary Wollstonecraft. Wilmot was invited to accompany the party of Stephen Moore, 2nd Earl Mount Cashell, and his wife on a grand tour of the continent. Her letters from the time survive, in France from November 1801 to October 1802, and in Italy until July 1803. The Mount Cashells entertained lavishly, especially during the first nine months in Paris, and through them she met Napoleon Bonaparte, and made friends with the Austrian painter Angelica Kauffman. She also met the French diplomat and politician Charles Maurice de Talleyrand-Périgord, and the Irish republican Robert Emmet fleetingly. She recounted her meeting in Rome with the English aristocrat Frederick Augustus Hervey, and her audience with the Pope, Pius VII. Wilmot returned to London from Italy in October 1803, via Germany and Denmark, after England and France resumed hostilities.

Wilmot then went to Russia to bring home her sister Martha, and spent two years there. Martha was in the country as a favourite of Princess Dashkov, one of the key figures of the Russian Enlightenment and a close friend to Catherine the Great. Martha was living at the Princess's estate in Troitskoe (on the Oka River, about 100 km from Moscow). Katherine Wilmot arrived on 4 August 1805, having set out from Cork on 5 June. Wilmot's writings from this time record the Russian aristocracy's opulence and attitudes to the servile classes (the serfs). The sisters came to know the customs the Russian elite, as well as the festivals and religious rites of the country people. Wilmot left Moscow on 4 July 1807, a combination of passport problems, wars and storms at sea, resulted in delays and in her reaching Yarmouth on 7 September 1807, and returning to Ireland in October 1807.

Wilmot moved to France, Moulins, to live in a warmer, drier climate than Ireland. Her health declined when she moved to Paris, dying there 28 March 1824. Her nephew by Martha, Wilmot Henry Bradford, lived to be "Father of the Army".

== Works ==
Wilmot had taken Martha's transcript of the memoirs of the Princess Dashkova when she left Russia. These were published by Martha in 1840, as she had burnt the original manuscript before her departure from Russia in 1808.

Wilmot's letters were published a century later, and have been described as a unique portrayal of the Napoleonic period. They describe the social scene, as well as the experience of travelling by coach and ship at that time. The family made transcriptions of the letters; the collection belonging to Martha were donated to the library of the Royal Irish Academy by Elisabeth van Dedem Lecky, the historian and writer. Amongst these Russian letters are a number written by Eleanor Cavanagh, who described the lives of servants. Wilmot's diaries were published in 1920 by Thomas Sadleir, and later by H. Montgomery Hyde and the Marchioness of Londonderry.

- An Irish Peer on the Continent, 1801-03 (1920)
- The Russian Journals of Martha and Catherine Wilmot (1934)
- More letters from Martha Wilmot; Vienna 1819-29 (1935)
- The Grand Tours of Katherine Wilmot, France 1801-1803, and Russia 1805-07 (Weidenfeld & Nicolson, 1992)
