= Lecky Professor of History =

Professorship and chair at Trinity College Dublin, Ireland

The Lecky Professorship of History, previously the Lecky Professorship of Modern History is a chair at Trinity College Dublin.

The professorship was founded in 1913 in memory of William Edward Hartpole Lecky, with an endowment from his widow.

== Lecky Professors of History ==
- Walter Alison Phillips, 1914–1939.
- Edmund Curtis, 1939–1943
- Constantia Maxwell, 1945–1951
- A. J. Otway-Ruthven, 1951-1980
- J. F. Lydon, 1980-1993
- I. S. Robinson, 1993-2015
- Ruth Mazo Karras, 2018–present
