= April FitzLyon =

English translator and biographer

- Born: Cecily April Mead; 22 April 1920; Langton Herring, Dorset, England
- Died: 17 September 1998 (aged 78)
- Education: Guildhall School of Music and Drama
- Occupations: Translator; biographer; historian
- Spouse: Kyril Zinovieff (m. 1941)
- Children: 2

April FitzLyon (born Cecily April Mead; 22 April 1920 – 17 September 1998) was an English translator, biographer, and historian.

== Early life ==
Born Cecily April Mead, at Langton Herring, Dorset, in 1920, she was educated as a small child in France and later at St Mary's, Calne, in the west of England. She studied the flute at the Guildhall School of Music, but did not go on to become a professional musician.

== Marriage and children ==
In 1941, aged 20, she married Kyril Zinovieff, a Russian émigré who took the surname FitzLyon and who worked at the Ministry of Defence. The couple had two sons, Sebastian, who became a businessman in France and later in Russia, and Julian, an information specialist. The family lived in Golders Green and later in Chiswick, moving in literary circles and having many Russian friends.

== Literary career ==
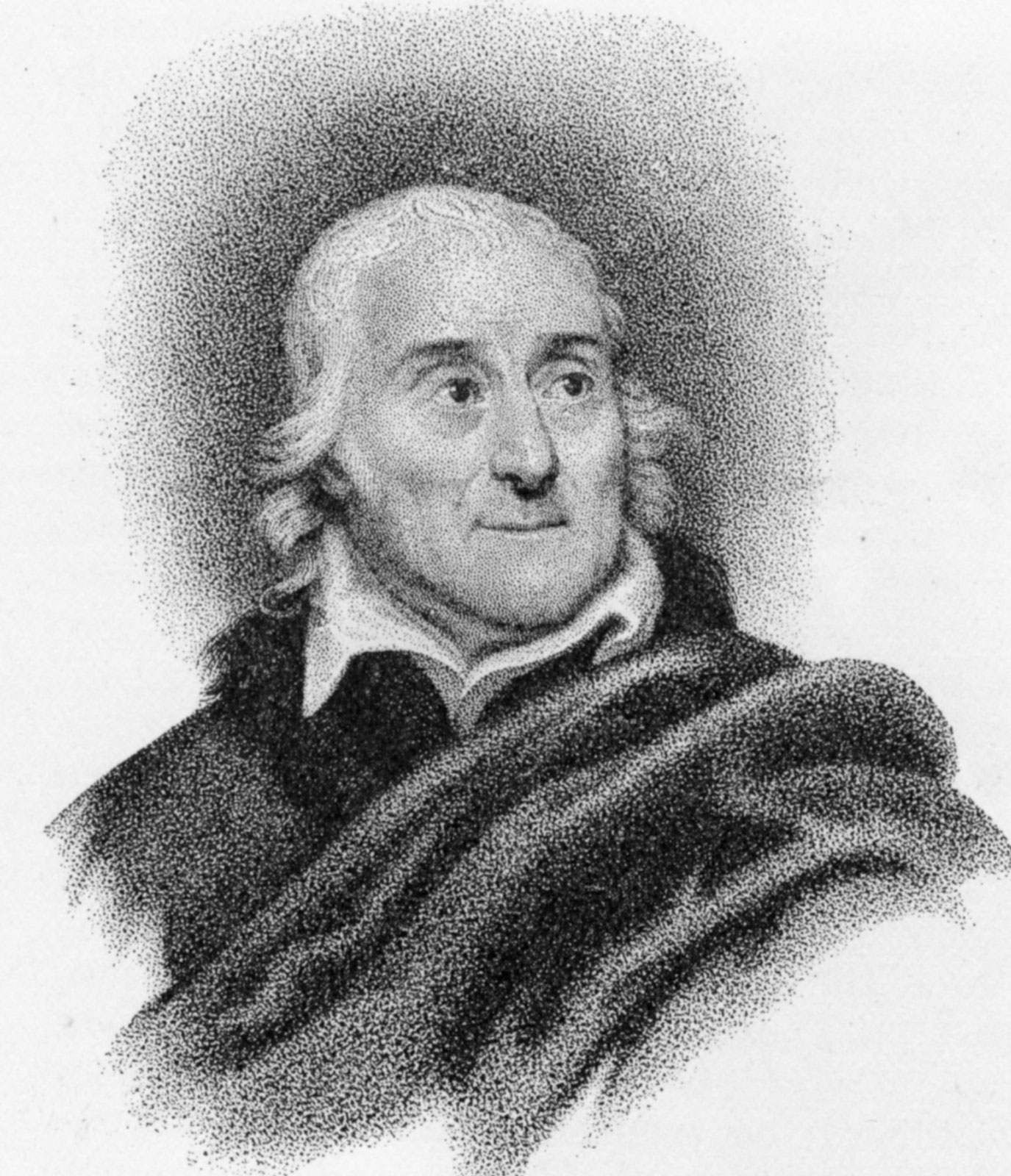
Lorenzo da Ponte, the subject of FitzLyon's first biography

FitzLyon learned Russian from her husband's mother. In the 1950s, she approached a publisher with translations of stories by Anton Chekhov that were unknown in the UK, which she had produced jointly with her husband. They were published in 1953 as The Woman in the Case and Other Stories. This was a great success and was quickly followed later the same year by translations of three short novels by Leo Tolstoy (Three Novellas, 1953). Of these, she translated two herself. She continued to translate literature from Russian, French and Italian, but began to concentrate on historical biographies. She published the first life of Lorenzo da Ponte, Mozart's librettist who had been a revolutionary in Venice, debunking Ponte's own unreliable memoirs (The Libertine Librettist, 1955). After that, she translated Émile Zola's Au bonheur des dames (Ladies Delight, 1957), the correspondence between Romain Rolland and Richard Strauss, and some recent French novels. She produced biographies of two Spanish singers, the daughters of Manuel del Pópulo Vicente García: firstly of Pauline García-Viardot, who was a star of nineteenth century France (The Price of Genius, 1964), and later a new life of Pauline Viardot's sister Maria Malibran, one of the most notable opera singers of the century (Maria Malibran: diva of the romantic age, 1987).

In researching her book on Viardot, FitzLyon found much on the singer's long relationship with Ivan Turgenev, and in 1983 she wrote the catalogue for the London Theatre Museum's centenary exhibition 'Turgenev and the Theatre'. In 1975 she published Nobody: or, The Disgospel according to Maria Dementnaya, a translation of a Russian samizdat novel, Nikto, which was about the seamy side of the life of Bohemian dissidents and had been smuggled out of Russia in 1966. She went on to translate verse from Russian into both English and French, contributed to Grove's Dictionary of Music and Musicians, and wrote articles and reviews, including work for Encounter, the Times Literary Supplement and The Literary Review.

The FitzLyons visited Russia both before and after the collapse of Communism. For about twenty-five years before her death, April FitzLyon was the General Secretary of the Russian Refugees Aid Society, and she made many broadcasts for BBC Radio. At the time of her death, her publisher John Calder called her "a scholar of the old school".

== Selected publications ==
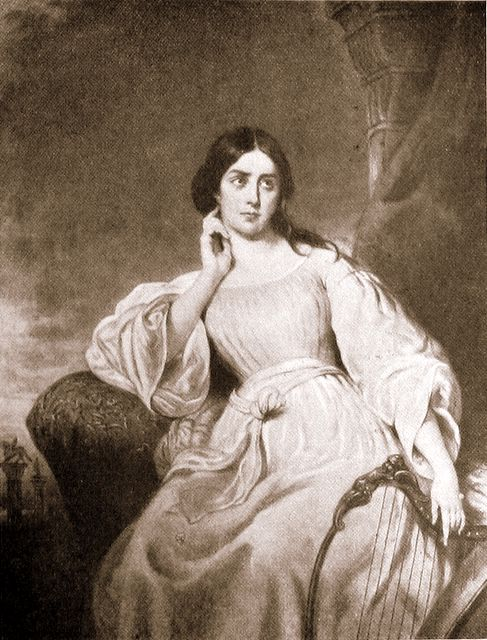
Maria Malibran

- The Woman in the Case and Other Stories (1953), translation of stories by Anton Chekhov (jointly with Kyril FitzLyon)
- Three Novellas (1953), translations of three short novels by Leo Tolstoy (one of the three jointly with Kyril FitzLyon)
- The Devil and Family Happiness, translation from Leo Tolstoy (London: Spearman & Calder, 1953, 2nd edition 1954)
- The Libertine Librettist (1955), a biography of Lorenzo da Ponte
- Ladies Delight (1957), translation of Émile Zola's Au bonheur des dames
- The Price of Genius (1964), a biography of Pauline García-Viardot
- Blaze of Embers (Calder and Boyars, 1971), translation of novel by André Pieyre de Mandiargues
- Nobody: or, The Disgospel according to Maria Dementnaya (1975), novel translated from the Russian
- Maria Malibran: diva of the romantic age (1987), a biography
- A month in the country: an exhibition presented by the Theatre Museum, Victoria and Albert Museum, and arranged in conjunction with April FitzLyon (with Alexander Schouvaloff) catalogue of the Victoria and Albert Museum's Theatre Museum Ivan Turgenev centenary exhibition (1983)
