= Jacqueline Murray =

Canadian medieval historian

Jacqueline Murray, FRSC, FRHistS (born October 1, 1953) is a Canadian medieval historian and professor emeritus of history at the University of Guelph. Her research focuses on sexuality and gender in medieval Europe, with a specific focus on masculinity and male sexuality. She has also studied marriage and the family in the Middles Ages.

== Education and career ==
Murray received her bachelor with honours from the University of British Columbia in 1978. She then attended the University of Toronto, where she obtained her master's degree in History in 1979. She earned her doctorate at the University of Toronto's Centre for Medieval Studies in 1987. She was a Canada Research Fellow with the Department of History at the University of Windsor from 1988 to 1991, and taught there as professor of history from 1988 to 2001. At the University of Windsor she was founding Director of the Humanities Research Group. She has worked as a professor at the University of Guelph since 2001, where she also served as dean of the College of Arts from 2001 to 2006 and director of First Year Seminars from 2011 to 2016. Since 2001, Murray has been a Status Professor at the Centre for Medieval Studies at the University of Toronto.

Murray served as chair of the Toronto Renaissance and Reformation Colloquium from 1987 to 1989. She was President of the Society for Medieval Feminist Scholarship from 1991 to 1993. From 1998 to 2000, she was President of the Canadian Society of Medievalists. Since 2001, Murray has been the co-editor on the Gender in the Middle Ages series published by Boydell & Brewer.

== Volunteer work and activism ==
On October 18, 2004, Murray organized a fundraising breakfast that raised funds for the Canadian Women for Women in Afghanistan, a charitable organization dedicated to supporting women's education in Afghanistan. The event was held on Persons Day, which commemorates the 1929 decision by the British Privy Council which declared women persons under Canadian law. Murray organized another charitable breakfast in support of the Canadian Women for Women in Afghanistan on March 5, 2009.

Murray has done considerable charitable and volunteer work in Ghana. In 2010, she participated in the Leave for Change program sponsored by the World University Service of Canada, where she spent three weeks in Accra, the Ghanaian capital. Her work there was with Child Rights International, a Ghanaian non-governmental organization, a group that lobbies for the rights of children in Ghana' Murray's work involved translating the Juvenile Justice Act into more accessible language for children, so that they understand their legal rights.

Murray returned to Ghana in 2012–13, spending thirteen weeks in Accra as an Organizational Policy Advisor with the Non-Formal Education Division, established by Ghana's Ministry of Education to promote nationwide literacy for those that did not attend school. Beyond her work as an advisor for NFED, Murray collaborated with the University of Guelph Library to donate computers to the NFED. Murray also established a crowd sourced project to raise money to replace old musical equipment for the Theatre for Development.

Murray published several articles in newspapers, including the National Post and the Globe and Mail, in the early 2000s detailing the history of marriage, arguing against the notion that the institution of marriage has always been between a man and a woman. In "Same-sex union: The final frontier of marriage evolution," Murray writes that marriage originally was only available to the wealthy of Ancient Rome. Over the centuries, marriage evolved to include the poor, slaves, members of the clergy, and more. Murray notes that the notion that these unions were purely for procreation is not supported by historical evidence, and that while it was rare, homosexual unions were recognized by Early Christian communities. Murray's sworn testimony was used as evidence in Halpern v. Canada, in support of recognizing same-sex unions as legal under Ontario law.

== Awards and accomplishments ==
- Elected Fellow of the Royal Society of Canada, 2025.
- Visiting fellowship, University of St. Michael's College of the University of Toronto, 2022
- Elected Fellow to the Royal Historical Society, 2021
- Donald Bullough Fellow in Mediaeval History, University of St. Andrews, Scotland, 2016-17
- 3M National Teaching Fellowship, Society for Teaching and Learning in Higher Education (STLHE) in 2014
- Woman of Distinction in Education & Training, YMCA/YWCA of Guelph, 2014
- Desire2Learn Innovation Award for Teaching and Learning, STLHE in 2013
- John Bell Award for Teaching Excellence, University of Guelph in 2013
- Special Merit Award, University of Guelph Faculty Association, 2011
- Visiting senior fellow, Green College, University of British Columbia, 2006-07
- Visiting fellow, Northrop Frye Centre. Victoria University in the University of Toronto, 1998–99
- Visiting fellow, Pontifical Institute Mediaeval Studies, Toronto, 1994–95 and 2017-18
- Visiting fellow, Clare Hall, University of Cambridge, 1994–95
- Senior fellow, Centre for Reformation and Renaissance Studies, Victoria University, Toronto, 1992–93 and 1996-97

== Selected publications ==
- From Texts to Bodies: Sexes, Genders, and Sexualities in Premodern Europe (London: Routledge, 2025).
- Premodern Masculinities in Transition. Edited by Konrad Eisenbichler and Jacqueline Murray. Gender in the Middle Ages, 23. (Woodbridge, UK: Boydell & Brewer, 2025).
- Patriarchy, Honour, and Violence: Masculinities in Premodern Europe. Edited by Jacqueline Murray. Studies and Texts, 57 (Toronto: CRRS, 2022).
- The Male Body and Social Masculinity in Premodern Europe. Edited and introduced by Jacqueline Murray. Studies and Texts, 56 (Toronto: CRRS, 2022)..
- Sex, Gender and Sexuality in Renaissance Italy. Edited by Jacqueline Murray and Nicholas Terpstra. (Abingdon, UK: Routledge, 2019).
- Marriage in Premodern Europe: Italy and Beyond. Edited and introduced by Jacqueline Murray (Toronto: CRRS, 2012).
- Love, Marriage and Family in the Middle Ages. A Reader. Peterborough: Broadview Press; Toronto: University of Toronto Press, 2001.
- Conflicted Identities and Multiple Masculinities: Men in the Medieval West. Edited by Jacqueline Murray. (New York: Garland: 2009; paperback, 2014)
- Desire and Discipline. Sex and Sexuality in the Premodern West. Edited by Jacqueline Murray and Konrad Eisenbichler. (Toronto: University of Toronto Press, 1996)
