= 12th century in philosophy =

This is a list of philosophy-related events in the 12th century. Philosophy at the time was influenced by the ongoing crusades.

== Events ==
c. 1114 – The School of Chartres flourishes as a center of Platonism and natural philosophy under masters like Bernard of Chartres and William of Conches.

1122 – The Concordat of Worms resolves the Investiture Controversy, distinguishing spiritual and temporal authority and influencing philosophical debates on church-state relations.

Mid-12th century – The Latin translation movement peaks, with key works of Aristotle, Avicenna, and Averroes translated in Toledo and Sicily, revitalizing Western philosophy.

1141 – At the Council of Sens, Peter Abelard's theological writings are condemned for heresy by Bernard of Clairvaux, highlighting tensions between dialectic and orthodoxy.

c. 1150 – The University of Paris emerges as a major center for philosophy and theology, fostering scholastic methods.

c. 1167 – The University of Oxford emerges, becoming another hub for philosophical inquiry in England.

== Publications ==
- The Incoherence of the Incoherence, the landmark harmonization of philosophy and faith by Averroes
- Sic et Non, Peter Abelard's scholastic study of apparent contradictions in Christian theology

== Births ==
- Al-Ghazali (1058–1111), Persian theologian and philosopher who critiqued philosophy in The Incoherence of the Philosophers.
- Gilbert of Poitiers (c. 1080–1154), French scholastic philosopher known for his metaphysical commentaries on Boethius.
- William of Conches (c. 1090–1154), French natural philosopher and Platonist associated with the School of Chartres.
- Ibn Tufayl (c. 1105–1185), Andalusian polymath and author of Hayy ibn Yaqdhan.
- Averroes (1126–1198), Andalusian polymath and Aristotelian commentator.
- Zhu Xi (1130–1200), Chinese Neo-Confucian philosopher of the Song dynasty.
- Maimonides (1135 or 1138–1204), Sephardic Jewish philosopher, astronomer, and physician.

== Deaths ==
- Al-Ghazali (1058–1111), Persian polymath whose works bridged Sufism and philosophy.
- Peter Abelard (1079–1142), French scholastic philosopher, theologian, and logician.
- Gilbert of Poitiers (c. 1080–1154), French philosopher and Bishop of Poitiers.
- William of Conches (c. 1090–after 1155), French natural philosopher.
- Ibn Tufayl (c. 1105–1185), Andalusian philosopher and physician.
- Hildegard of Bingen (1098–1179), German Benedictine abbess, visionary mystic, and polymath.
- Averroes (1126–1198), Andalusian polymath.

== See also ==
- 12th-century Renaissance
- Medieval philosophy
- List of centuries in philosophy
