= Standing on the shoulders of giants =

Metaphor acknowledging past thinkers

The phrase "standing on the shoulders of giants" is a metaphor which means "using the understanding gained by major thinkers who have gone before in order to make intellectual progress".

It is a metaphor of a person who wants to reach higher, standing on the shoulders of giants (Latin: nani gigantum humeris insidentes) and expresses the meaning of "discovering truth by building on previous discoveries". This concept has been dated to the 12th century and, according to John of Salisbury, is attributed to Bernard of Chartres. Its most familiar and popular expression occurs in a 1675 letter by Isaac Newton: "if I have seen further [than others], it is by standing on the shoulders of giants."

== Early references ==
=== Middle Ages ===
The earliest documented attestation of this aphorism appears in 1123 in William of Conches's Glosses on Priscian's Institutiones grammaticae. Where Priscian says quanto juniores, tanto perspicaciores (young men simply can see more sharply), William comments:

The ancients had only the books which they themselves wrote, but we have all their books and moreover all those which have been written from the beginning until our time.… Hence we are like a dwarf perched on the shoulders of a giant. The former sees further than the giant, not because of his own stature, but because of the stature of his bearer. Similarly, we [moderns] see more than the ancients, because our writings, modest as they are, are added to their great works.

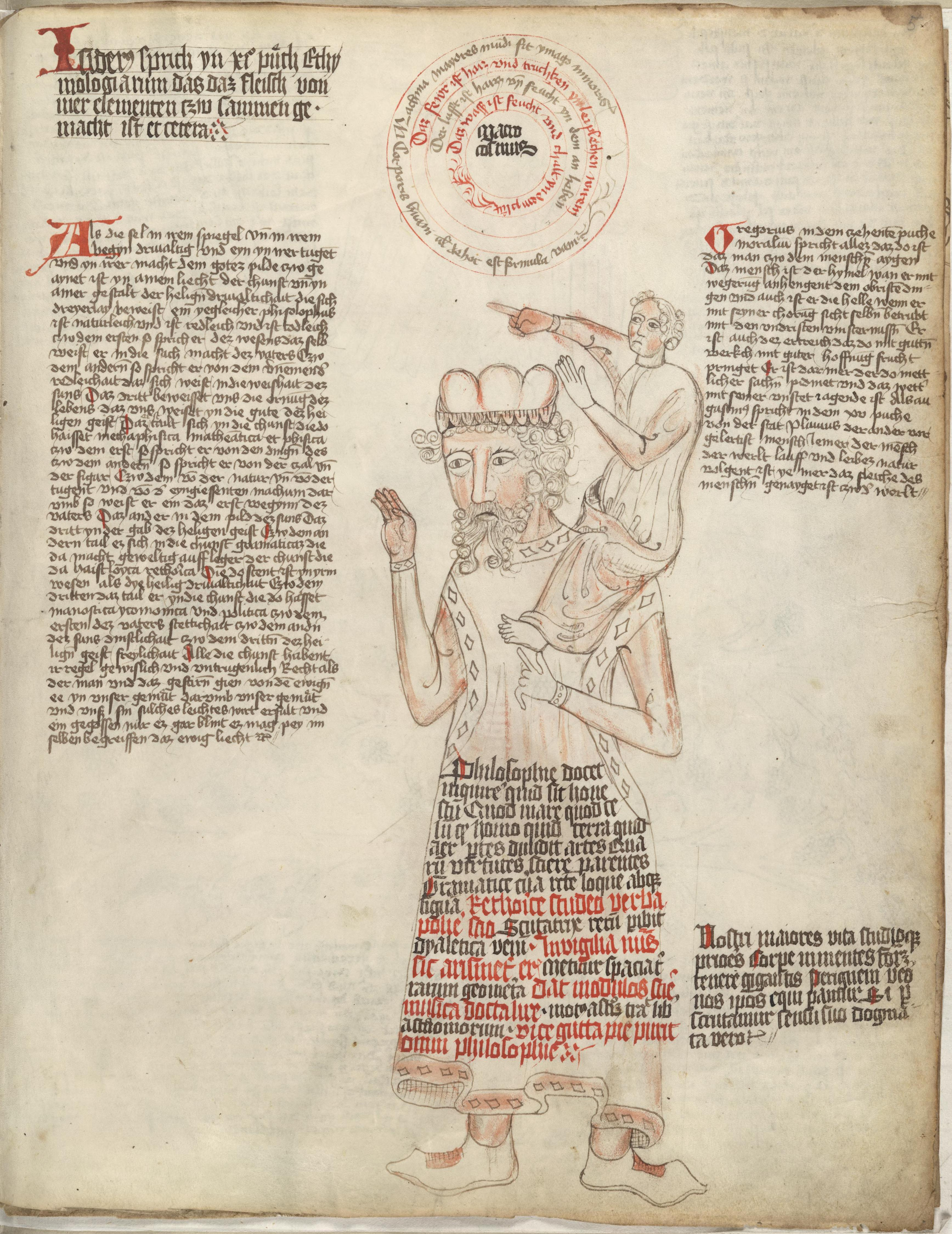
"Our elders, in higher life and study, had the appearance of the giant with the commanding body; We can, through ardor, equal them, if we scrutinize their teachings with good sense." (c. 1410)

The same aphorism was attributed to Bernard of Chartres by John of Salisbury, who in 1159 wrote:

Bernard of Chartres used to compare us to dwarfs perched on the shoulders of giants. He pointed out that we see more and farther than our predecessors, not because we have keener vision or greater height, but because we are lifted up and borne aloft on their gigantic stature.

According to medieval historian Richard William Southern, Bernard was comparing contemporary 12th century scholars to the ancient scholars of Greece and Rome. A similar conceit also appears in a contemporary work on church history by Ordericus Vitalis.

[The phrase] sums up the quality of the cathedral schools in the history of learning, and indeed characterizes the age which opened with Gerbert (950–1003) and Fulbert (960–1028) and closed in the first quarter of the 12th century with Peter Abelard. [The phrase] is not a great claim; neither, however, is it an example of abasement before the shrine of antiquity. It is a very shrewd and just remark, and the important and original point was the dwarf could see a little further than the giant. That this was possible was above all due to the cathedral schools with their lack of a well-rooted tradition and their freedom from a clearly defined routine of study.

== Religious texts ==
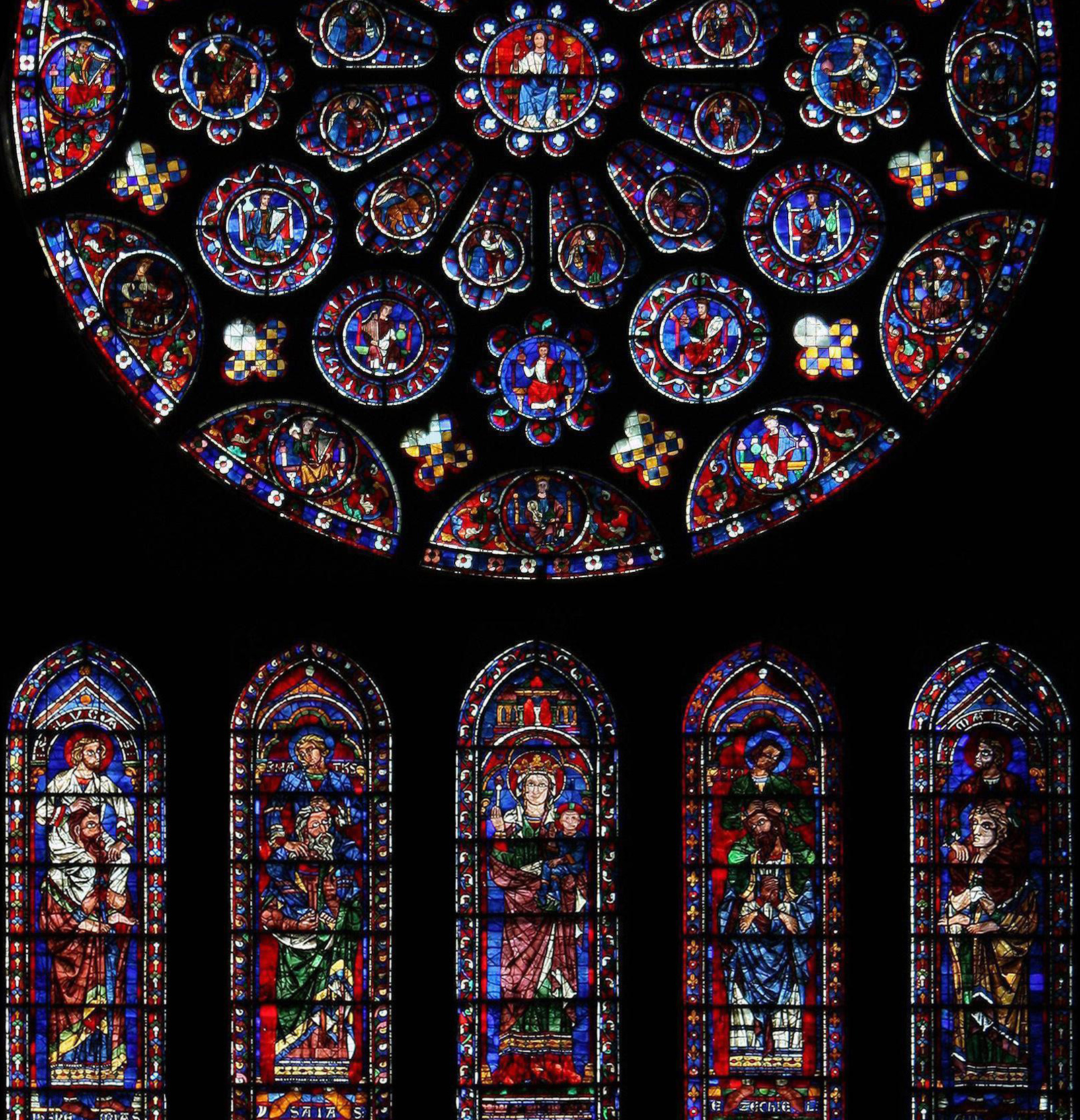
An illustration of New Testament evangelists on the shoulders of Old Testament prophets, looking up at the Messiah (from the south rose window of Chartres Cathedral)

The visual image (from Bernard of Chartres) appears in the stained glass of the south transept of Chartres Cathedral. The tall windows under the rose window show the four major prophets of the Hebrew Bible (Isaiah, Jeremiah, Ezekiel, and Daniel) as gigantic figures, and the four New Testament evangelists (Matthew, Mark, Luke, and John) as ordinary-size people sitting on their shoulders. The evangelists, though smaller, "see more" than the huge prophets (since they saw the Messiah about whom the prophets spoke).

The phrase also appears in the works of the Jewish tosaphist Isaiah di Trani (c. 1180 – c. 1250):

Should Joshua the son of Nun endorse a mistaken position, I would reject it out of hand, I do not hesitate to express my opinion, regarding such matters in accordance with the modicum of intelligence allotted to me. I was never arrogant claiming "My Wisdom served me well". Instead I applied to myself the parable of the philosophers. For I heard the following from the philosophers, The wisest of the philosophers was asked: "We admit that our predecessors were wiser than we. At the same time we criticize their comments, often rejecting them and claiming that the truth rests with us. How is this possible?" The wise philosopher responded: "Who sees further a dwarf or a giant? Surely a giant for his eyes are situated at a higher level than those of the dwarf. But if the dwarf is placed on the shoulders of the giant who sees further? ... So too we are dwarfs astride the shoulders of giants. We master their wisdom and move beyond it. Due to their wisdom we grow wise and are able to say all that we say, but not because we are greater than they.

== Early modern and modern references ==
=== Isaac Newton ===
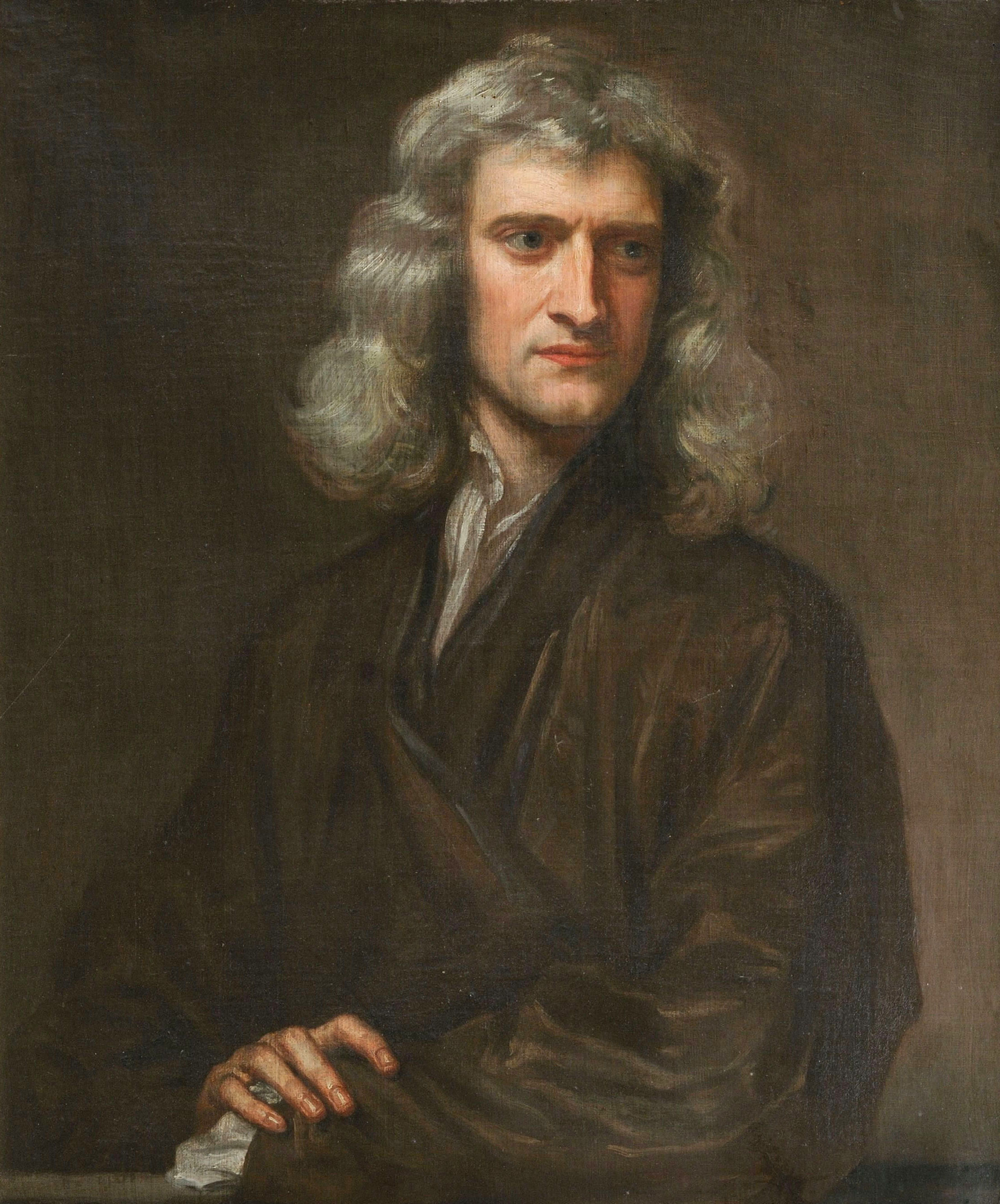
The quote is most often attributed to Sir Isaac Newton in a letter to his rival, Robert Hooke

Isaac Newton remarked in a letter to his rival Robert Hooke written in 5 February 1675 and published in 1855:

What Des-Cartes [sic] did was a good step. You have added much several ways, & especially in taking the colours of thin plates into philosophical consideration. If I have seen further it is by standing on the shoulders of Giants.

This has recently been interpreted by a few writers as a sarcastic remark directed at Hooke's appearance. Although Hooke was not of particularly short stature, he was of slight build and had been afflicted from his youth with a severe kyphosis.

=== Others ===
Juan Luis Vives quotes the phrase "on shoulders of giants" in his De causis corruptarum artium (1531) with disapproval:

For it is a false and fond similitude, which some writers adopt, though they think it witty and suitable, that we are, compared with the ancients, as dwarfs upon the shoulders of giants. It is not so. Neither are we dwarfs, nor they giants, but we are all of one stature, save that we are lifted up somewhat higher by their means, provided that there be found in us the same studiousness, watchfulness and love of truth, as was in them. If these conditions be lacking, then we are not dwarfs, nor set on the shoulders of giants, but men of a competent stature, grovelling on the earth.

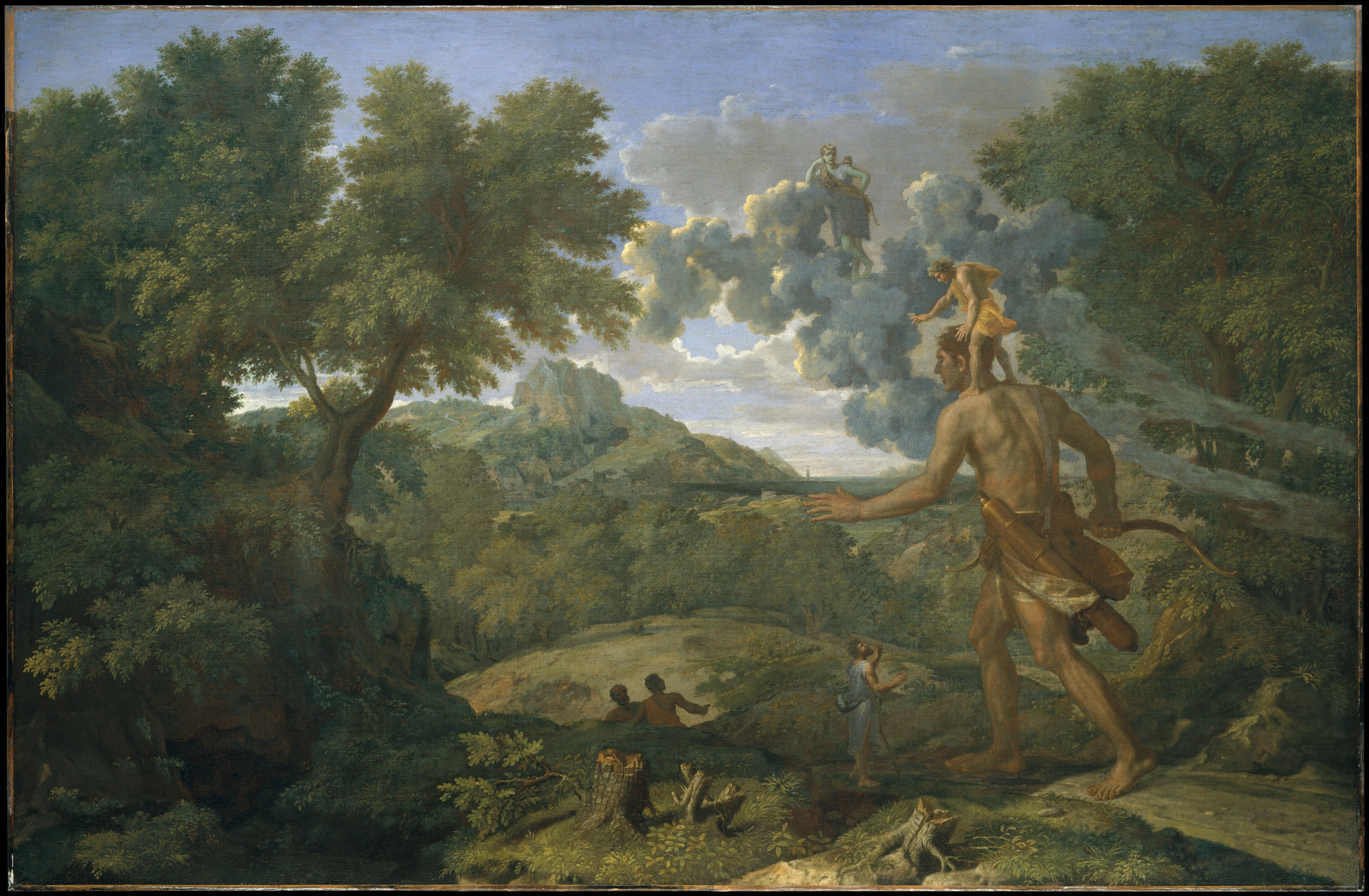
Cedalion on Orion's shoulders in a 1658 painting by Nicolas Poussin

Diego de Estella took up the quotation in his 1578 commentary on Gospel of Luke and by the 17th century it had become commonplace. Robert Burton, in the second edition of The Anatomy of Melancholy (1624), quotes Stella thus:

I say with Didacus Stella, a dwarf standing on the shoulders of a giant may see farther than a giant himself.

Later editors of Burton misattributed the quotation to Lucan; in their hands Burton's attribution Didacus Stella, in luc 10, tom. ii "Didacus on the Gospel of Luke, chapter 10; volume 2" became a reference to Lucan's Pharsalia 2.10. No reference or allusion to the quotation is found there.

In 1634, Marin Mersenne quoted the expression in his Questions harmoniques:

... comme l'on dit, il est bien facile, & mesme necessaire de voir plus loin que nos devanciers, lors que nous sommes montez sur leur espaules ...

Blaise Pascal, in the "Preface to the Treatise on the Vacuum" expresses the same idea, without talking about shoulders, but rather about the knowledge handed down to us by the ancients as steps that allow us to climb higher and see farther than they could:

C'est de cette façon que l'on peut aujourd'hui prendre d'autres sentiments et de nouvelles opinions sans mépris et sans ingratitude, puisque les premières connaissances qu'ils nous ont données ont servi de degrés aux nôtres, et que dans ces avantages nous leur sommes redevables de l'ascendant que nous avons sur eux; parce que s'étant élevés jusqu'à un certain degré où ils nous ont portés, le moindre effort nous fait monter plus haut, et avec moins de peine et moins de gloire nous nous trouvons au-dessus d'eux. C'est de là que nous pouvons découvrir des choses qu'il leur était impossible d'apercevoir. Notre vue a plus d'étendue; et, quoiqu'ils connussent aussi bien que nous tout ce qu'ils pouvaient remarquer de la nature, ils n'en connaissaient pas tant néanmoins, et nous voyons plus qu'eux.

Later in the 17th century, George Herbert, in his Jacula Prudentum (1651), wrote "A dwarf on a giant's shoulders sees farther of the two."

Samuel Taylor Coleridge, in The Friend (1828), wrote:

The dwarf sees farther than the giant, when he has the giant's shoulder to mount on.

Against this notion, Friedrich Nietzsche argues that a dwarf (the academic scholar) brings even the most sublime heights down to his level of understanding. In the section of Thus Spoke Zarathustra (1882) entitled "On the Vision and the Riddle", Zarathustra climbs to great heights with a dwarf on his shoulders to show him his greatest thought. Once there however, the dwarf fails to understand the profundity of the vision and Zarathustra reproaches him for "making things too easy on [him]self." If there is to be anything resembling "progress" in the history of philosophy, Nietzsche in "Philosophy in the Tragic Age of the Greeks" (1873) writes, it can only come from those rare giants among men, "each giant calling to his brother through the desolate intervals of time", an idea he got from Schopenhauer's work in Der handschriftliche Nachlass.

== Contemporary references ==
- Robert King Merton, one of the 'founding fathers' of sociology, titled a book On the Shoulders of Giants: A Shandean Postscript. In it, he traces the history of Newton's famous comment "If I have seen farther, it is by standing on the shoulders of giants" back to centuries earlier, in the rambling style of Laurence Sterne's The Life and Opinions of Tristram Shandy, Gentleman.
- NASA's official film of the Apollo 17 lunar landing mission was titled On the Shoulders of Giants.
- R.E.M. references the phrase in the chorus of their song King Of Birds: "Standing on the shoulders of giants leaves me cold"
- Umberto Eco writes in his 1980 novel The Name of the Rose, that Nicholas of Morimondo laments, "We no longer have the learning of the ancients, the age of giants is past!" To which the protagonist, William of Baskerville, replies: "We are dwarfs, but dwarfs who stand on the shoulders of those giants, and small though we are, we sometimes manage to see farther on the horizon than they."
- The British two pound coin bears the inscription STANDING ON THE SHOULDERS OF GIANTS on its edge.
- Standing on the Shoulder of Giants is the title of the fourth studio album by English rock band Oasis. The title was actually a misquote by Noel Gallagher after seeing the quote on the British two pound coin while in a pub.
- Stephen Hawking stated: "Each generation stands on the shoulders of those who have gone before them, just as I did as a young PhD student in Cambridge, inspired by the work of Isaac Newton, James Clerk Maxwell and Albert Einstein." Additionally, Hawking wrote a book called On the Shoulders of Giants, which explores the major works of physics and astronomy that inspired him.
- Google Scholar, a search engine for academic literature, displays the phrase "Stand on the shoulders of giants" below the search field.

== See also ==
- Collective intelligence
- Derivative work
- Distributed cognition
- Great Conversation
- School of Chartres
- Stigler's law of eponymy
- William of Ockham's Razor
