= Renaissance of the 12th century =

Period during the High Middle Ages of European history

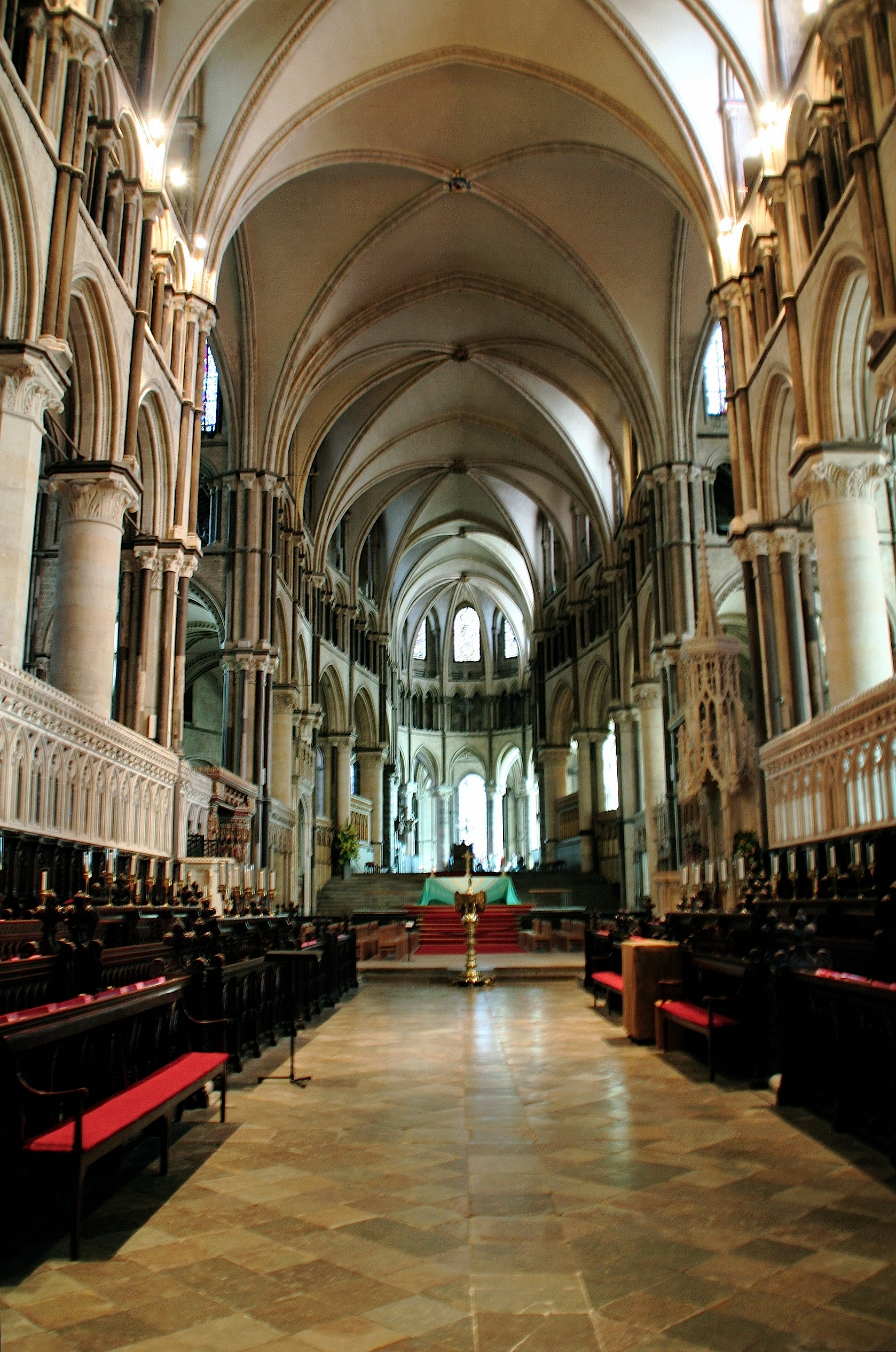
New technological discoveries allowed the development of Gothic architecture, shown here at Canterbury Cathedral

The Renaissance of the 12th century was a period of many changes at the outset of the High Middle Ages. It included social, political and economic transformations, and an intellectual revitalization of Western Europe with strong philosophical and scientific roots. These changes paved the way for later achievements such as the literary and artistic movement of the Italian Renaissance in the 15th century and the scientific developments of the 17th century.

Following the Western Roman Empire's collapse, Europe experienced a decline in scientific knowledge. However, increased contact with the Islamic world brought a resurgence of learning. Islamic philosophers and scientists preserved and expanded upon ancient Greek works, especially those of Aristotle and Euclid, which were translated into Latin, significantly revitalizing European science. During the High Middle Ages, Europe also saw significant technological advancements which spurred economic growth.

During the 12th century, Scholasticism emerged, marked by a systematic and rational approach to theology. The movement was strengthened by new Latin translations of ancient and medieval Islamic and Jewish philosophers, including Avicenna, Maimonides, and Averroes.

The early 12th century saw a revival of Latin classics and literature, with cathedral schools like Chartres and Canterbury becoming centers of study. Aristotelian logic later gained prominence in emerging universities, displacing Latin literary traditions until revived by Petrarch in the 14th century.

== Medieval renaissances ==
The groundwork for the rebirth of learning was laid by the process of political consolidation and centralization of the monarchies of Europe. This process of centralization began with Charlemagne, King of the Franks from 768 to 814 and Holy Roman Emperor from 800 to 814. Charlemagne's inclination towards education, which led to the creation of many new churches and schools where students were required to learn Latin and Greek, has been called the Carolingian Renaissance.

A second "renaissance" occurred during the reign of Otto I (The Great), King of the Saxons from 936 to 973 and Emperor of the Holy Roman Empire from 962. Otto was successful in unifying his kingdom and asserting his right to appoint bishops and archbishops throughout his kingdom. Otto's assumption of this ecclesiastical power brought him into close contact with the best educated and most able class of men in his kingdom. Because of this close contact many new reforms were introduced in the Saxon Kingdom and in the Holy Roman Empire. Thus, Otto's reign has been called the Ottonian Renaissance.

Therefore, the Renaissance of the 12th century has been identified as the third and final of the medieval renaissances. Yet the renaissance of the twelfth century was far more thoroughgoing than those renaissances that preceded in the Carolingian or in the Ottonian periods. Indeed, the Carolingian Renaissance was really more particular to Charlemagne himself, and was really more of a "veneer on a changing society" than a true renaissance springing up from society, and the same might be said of the Ottonian Renaissance. Therefore, some medieval historians have since argued that connecting the term "renaissance" to the two previous periods is a misleading description, and not useful in describing the social changes of the 9th and 10th centuries.

== Historiography ==
Harvard professor Charles Homer Haskins was the first historian to write extensively about a renaissance that ushered in the High Middle Ages starting about 1070. In 1927, he wrote that:

[The 12th century in Europe] was in many respects an age of fresh and vigorous life. The epoch of the Crusades, of the rise of towns, and of the earliest bureaucratic states of the West, it saw the culmination of Romanesque art and the beginnings of Gothic; the emergence of the vernacular literatures; the revival of the Latin classics and of Latin poetry and Roman law; the recovery of Greek science, with its Arabic additions, and of much of Greek philosophy; and the origin of the first European universities. The 12th century left its signature on higher education, on the scholastic philosophy, on European systems of law, on architecture and sculpture, on the liturgical drama, on Latin and vernacular poetry...

The English art historian Kenneth Clark wrote that Western Europe's first "great age of civilisation" was ready to begin around the year 1000. From 1100, he wrote, monumental abbeys and cathedrals were constructed and decorated with sculptures, hangings, mosaics and works belonging to one of the greatest epochs of art and providing stark contrast to the monotonous and cramped conditions of ordinary living during the period. Abbot Suger of the Abbey of St. Denis is considered an influential early patron of Gothic architecture and believed that love of beauty brought people closer to God: "The dull mind rises to truth through that which is material". Clark calls this "the intellectual background of all the sublime works of art of the next century and in fact has remained the basis of our belief of the value of art until today".

== Translation movement ==
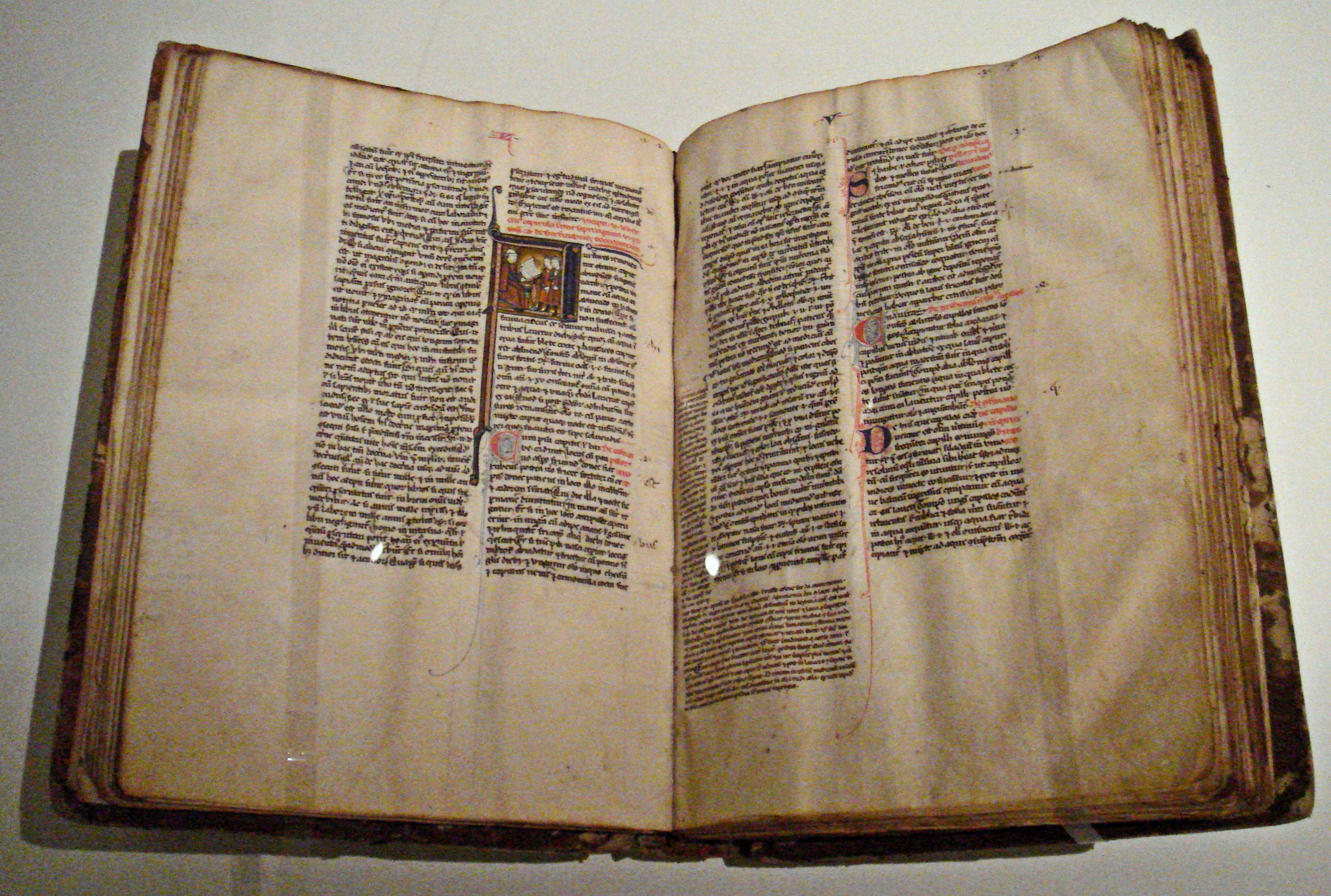
Al-Razi's Recueil des traités de médecine translated by Gerard of Cremona, from the second half of the 13th century.

The translation of texts from other cultures, especially ancient Greek works, was an important aspect of both this Twelfth-Century Renaissance and the later Renaissance of the 15th century.

== Trade and commerce ==
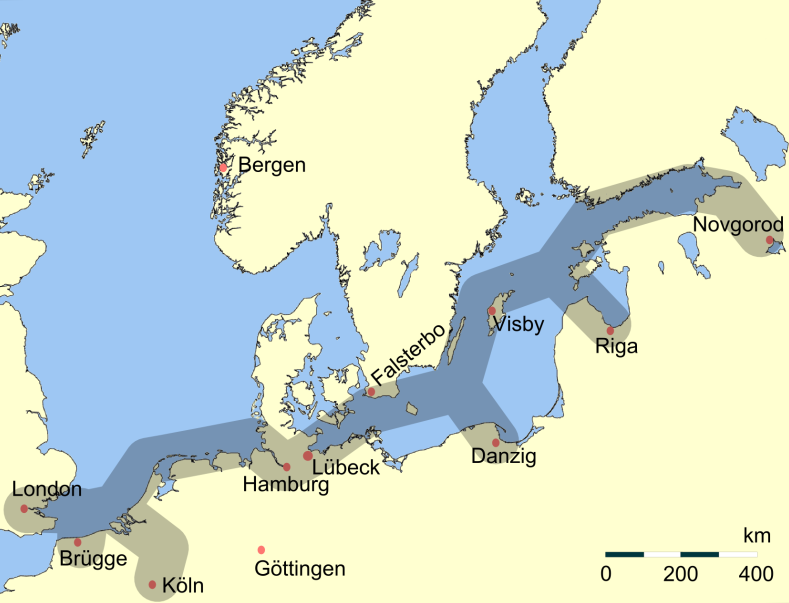
Main trading routes of the Hanseatic League

The era of the Crusades brought large groups of Europeans into contact with the technologies and luxuries of Byzantium for the first time in many centuries. Crusaders returning to Europe brought numerous small luxuries and souvenirs with them, stimulating a new appetite for trade. The rising Italian maritime powers such as Genoa and Venice began to monopolize trade between Europe, Muslims, and Byzantium via the Mediterranean Sea, having developed advanced commercial and financial techniques; cities such as Florence became major centers of this financial industry.

In Northern Europe, the Hanseatic League emerged in the 12th century, after the foundation of the city of Lübeck in 1158–1159. Many northern cities of the Holy Roman Empire became Hanseatic cities, including Hamburg, Stettin, Bremen and Rostock. Hanseatic cities outside the Holy Roman Empire were, for instance, Bruges, London and the Polish city of Gdańsk (Danzig). In Bergen and Novgorod the league had factories and middlemen. In this period the Germans started colonizing Eastern Europe beyond the Empire, into Prussia and Silesia.

In the mid 13th century, the Pax Mongolica re-invigorated the land-based trade routes between China and West Asia that had fallen dormant in the 9th and 10th centuries. Following the Mongol incursion into Europe in 1241, the Pope and some European rulers sent clerics as emissaries and/or missionaries to the Mongol court; these included William of Rubruck, Giovanni da Pian del Carpini, Andrew of Longjumeau, Odoric of Pordenone, Giovanni de Marignolli, Giovanni di Monte Corvino, and other travelers such as Niccolò da Conti. While the accounts of Carpini et al were written in Latin as letters to their sponsors, the account of the later Italian traveller Marco Polo, who followed his father and uncle as far as China, was written first in Franco-Venetian c. 1300 and later in other popular languages, making it relatively accessible to larger groups of Europeans.

== Science ==
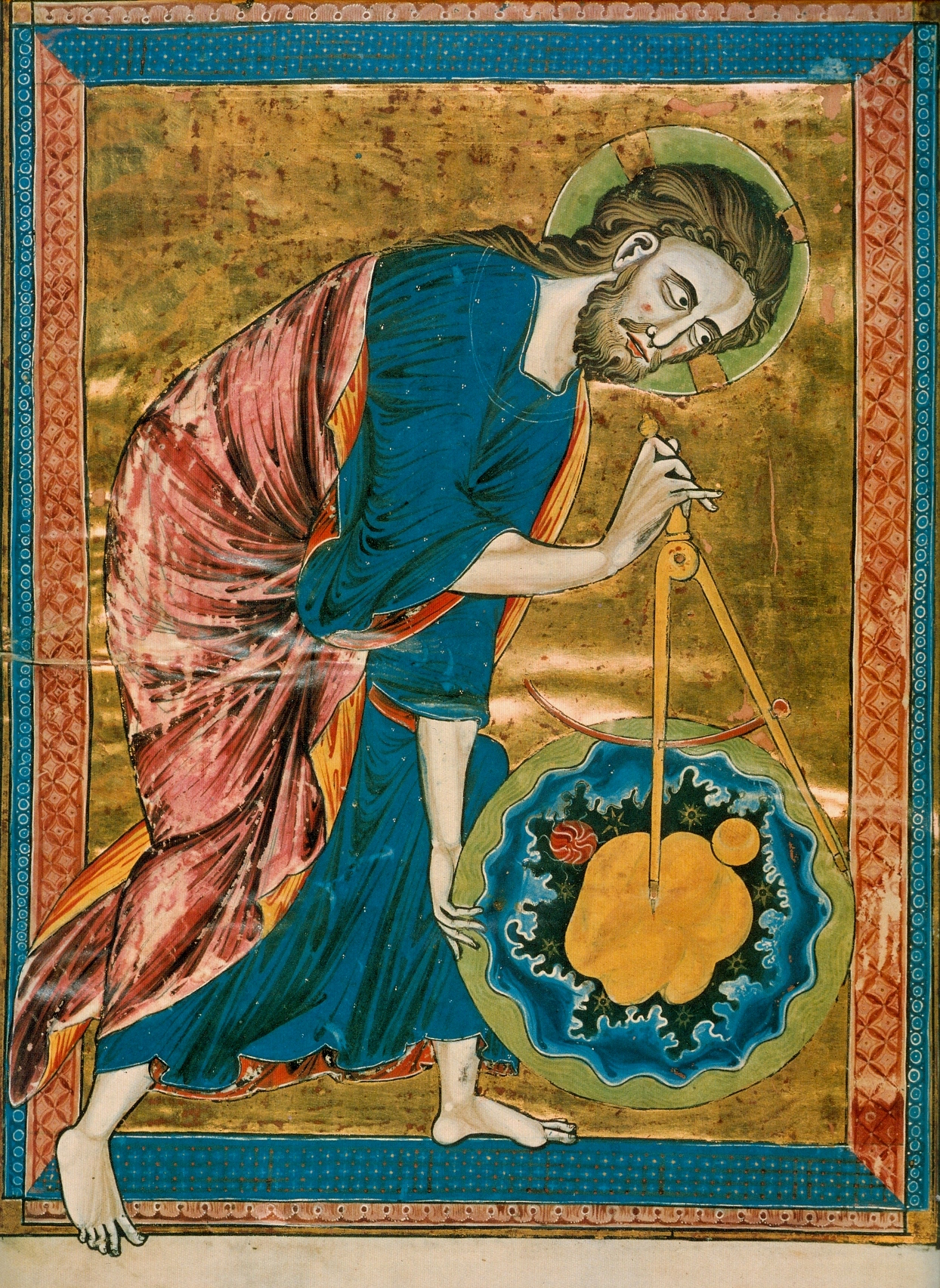
God the Geometer: medieval scholars sought to understand the geometric and harmonic principles by which God has created the universe.

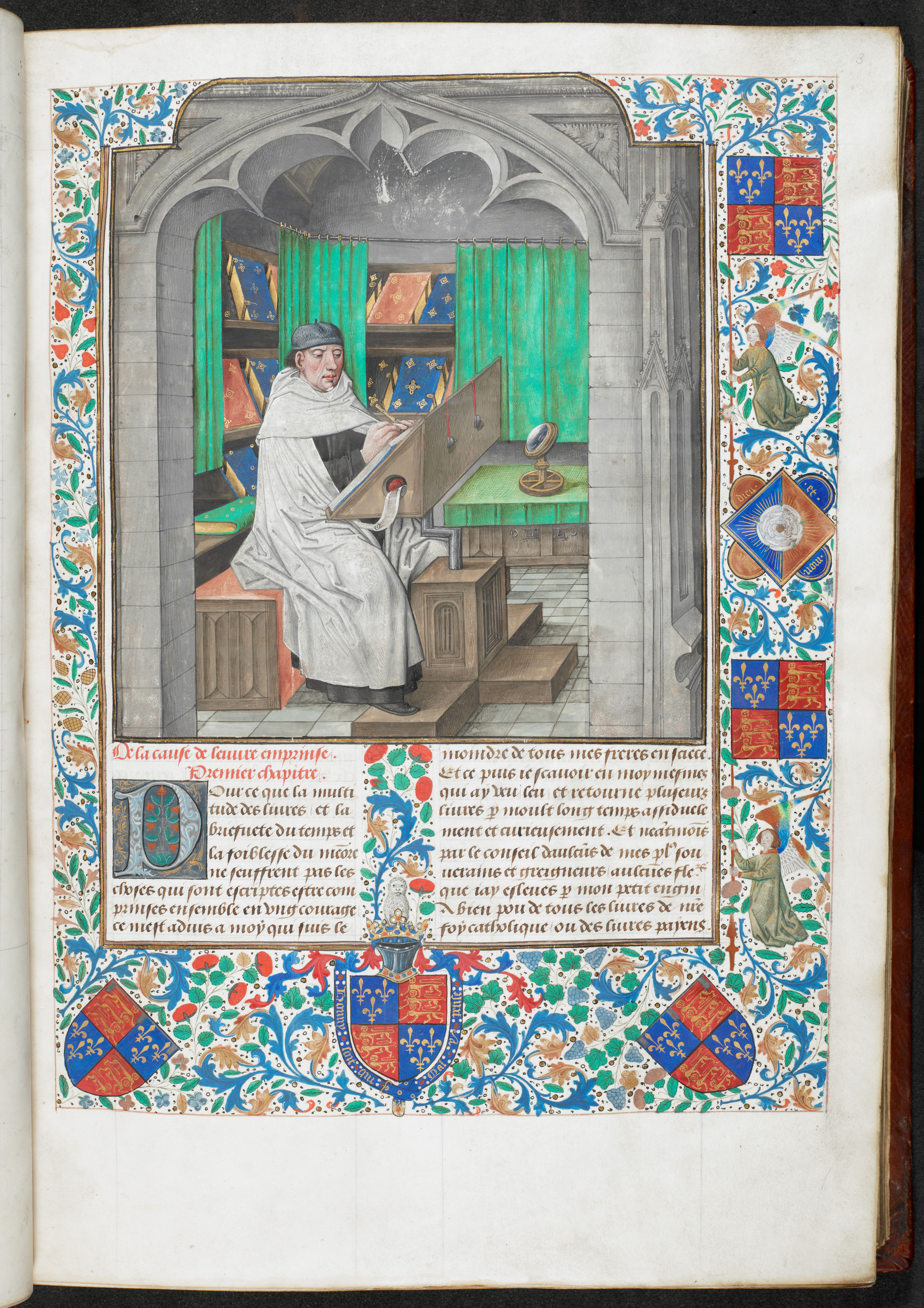
A miniature showing the copying of a manuscript in a scriptorium

After the collapse of the Western Roman Empire, Western Europe had entered the Middle Ages with great difficulties. Apart from depopulation and other factors, most scientific treatises of classical antiquity, written in Greek or Latin, had become unavailable or lost entirely. Philosophical and scientific teaching of the Early Middle Ages was based upon the few Latin translations and commentaries on ancient Greek scientific and philosophical texts that remained in the Latin West, the study of which remained at minimal levels. Only the Christian church maintained copies of these written works, and they were periodically replaced and distributed to other churches.

This scenario changed during the renaissance of the 12th century. For several centuries, popes had been sending clerics to the various kings of Europe. Kings of Europe were typically illiterate. Literate clerics would be specialists of some subject or other, such as music, medicine or history etc., otherwise known as Roman cohors amicorum, the root of the Italian word corte, 'court'. As such, these clerics would become part of a king's retinue or court, educating the king and his children, paid for by the pope, whilst facilitating the spread of knowledge into the Middle Ages. The church maintained classic scriptures in scrolls and books in numerous scriptoria across Europe, thus preserving the classic knowledge and allowing access to this important information to the European kings. In return, kings were encouraged to build monasteries that would act as hospitals, orphanages and schools, benefiting societies and eventually smoothing the transition from the Middle Ages.

The increased contact with the Islamic world in Muslim-dominated Iberia (Al-Andalus) and Southern Italy, the Crusades, the Reconquista, as well as increased contact with Byzantium, allowed Western Europeans to seek and translate the works of Hellenic and Islamic philosophers and scientists, especially the works of Aristotle. Several translations were made of Euclid but no extensive commentary was written until the middle of the 13th century.

The development of medieval universities allowed them to aid materially in the translation and propagation of these texts and started a new infrastructure which was needed for scientific communities. In fact, the European university put many of these texts at the centre of its curriculum, with the result that the "medieval university laid far greater emphasis on science than does its modern counterpart and descendant."

At the beginning of the 13th century, there were reasonably accurate Latin translations of some ancient Greek scientific works, though not of the Mechanika, an accurate translation of Euclid, or of the scientific advances of the neo-Platonists. But those texts that were available were studied and elaborated, leading to new insights into the nature of the universe. The influence of this revival is evident in the scientific work of Robert Grosseteste and the neo-Platonism of Bernardus Silvestris.

== Technology ==
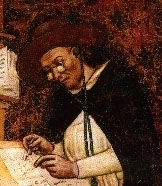
Detail of a portrait of Hugh of Provence, painted by Tommaso da Modena in 1352

During the High Middle Ages in Europe, there was increased innovation in means of production, its mechanization and the division of labor, leading to economic growth and more general prosperity, as tasks formerly done by hand or by foot, like grinding corn, producing vegetable oils, wine and beer, or pulping fibres for wool, linen and paper, were transferred to mechanical powers.

Water-driven hammers to pulp plant fibres for textiles are documented as early as 1010 in Upper Palatinate in Germany. Hemp is manufactured mechanically in France (Grésivaudan) around 1040, where a fulling mill is first mentioned in Normandy about 1086, and the chapter of Notre-Dame de Paris runs a tanning mill, documented in 1138. First windmills (post mills) are developed in the 12th century, and even exported to the Middle East during the Third Crusade. By the end of the 12th century they were so numerous, that Pope Celestine III (1191–98) put a tax on them. Waterpowered paper mills were first documented in 1238 in Spanish Valencia, and in 1268 Fabriano in the Southeast of the Italian peninsula had seven mills producing paper. In 1326 a first paper mill in France is recorded in Puy-de-Déme (Auvergne).

The magnetic compass aided navigation, attested in Europe in the late 12th century, the dry compass was invented in 12th century France, and the astrolabe of ancient Greek origin returned to Europe via Islamic Spain. The West's oldest known depiction of a stern-mounted rudder can be found on church carvings dating to around 1180, and the mechanical clock was developed in the 13th century.

== Latin literature ==
The early 12th century saw a revival of the study of Latin classics, prose, and verse before and independent of the revival of Greek philosophy in Latin translation. The cathedral schools at Chartres, Orléans, and Canterbury were centers of Latin literature staffed by notable scholars. John of Salisbury, secretary at Canterbury, became the bishop of Chartres. He held Cicero in the highest regard in philosophy, language, and the humanities. Latin humanists possessed and read virtually all the Latin authors we have today—Ovid, Virgil, Terence, Horace, Seneca, Cicero. The exceptions were few—Tacitus, Livy, Lucretius. In poetry, Virgil was universally admired, followed by Ovid.

Like the earlier Carolingian revival, the 12th-century Latin revival would not be permanent. While religious opposition to pagan Roman literature existed, Charles Homer Haskins argues that "it was not religion but logic" in particular "Aristotle's New Logic toward the middle of [the 12th] century [that] threw a heavy weight on the side of dialectic ..." at the expense of the letters, literature, oratory, and poetry of the Latin authors. The nascent universities would become Aristotelian centers displacing the Latin humanist heritage until its final revival by Petrarch in the 14th century.

== Roman law ==
The recovery of Justinian's Digest in the late eleventh century led to a revival of Roman legal studies at Bologna. Irnerius and the jurists who followed him, later known as the glossators, added explanatory notes to the text and tried to reconcile passages that appeared to contradict one another. Bologna attracted students from other parts of Europe, and its methods were adopted by legal scholars outside Italy. Together with canon law, the revived study of Roman law helped shape the ius commune, which supplemented local laws in much of continental Europe.

== Scholasticism ==
A new form of Christian theology developed during this period, championed by scholastics or "schoolmen" who emphasized a more systematic and rational approach to divine matters. Initially inspired by reconsideration of Boethius's commentaries of Aristotle's works on logic and Calcidius's commentary on Plato's Timaeus—the chief works through which the two philosophers were then known to the Latin West—by St Anselm and Chartrians like Bernard of Chartres and William of Conches, the movement was strengthened by increased access to the works of ancient scholars and thinkers from new Latin translations by Constantine the African in the Papal States, the Toledo School of Translators in Castile, James of Venice in Constantinople, and others.

The same avenues (particularly in Spain) spread medieval Islamic and Jewish philosophical considerations, particularly those of Maimonides, Avicenna, and Averroes. France—particularly the University of Paris—became a center of the transmission of these new texts but several early French figures such as Roscelin, Peter Abelard, and William of Conches were either condemned for heresy or obliged to bowdlerize their treatment of sensitive subjects like Plato's world soul. Subsequently, scholastic scholars of the 13th century such as Albertus Magnus, Bonaventure, and Thomas Aquinas became revered as doctors of the Church through using secular study and logic to uphold and buttress existing orthodoxy. One of the main questions during this period was the problem of the universals.

Prominent non-scholastics of the time included Peter Damian, Bernard of Clairvaux, and the Victorines.

== Arts ==
The 12th-century renaissance saw a revival of interest in poetry. Writing mostly in their own native languages, contemporary poets produced significantly more work than those of the Carolingian Renaissance. The subject matter varied wildly across epic, lyric, and dramatic. Meter was no longer confined to the classical forms and began to diverge into newer schemes. Additionally, the division between religious and secular poetry became smaller. In particular, the Goliards were noted for profane parodies of religious texts.

These expansions of poetic form contributed to the rise of vernacular literature, which tended to prefer the newer rhythms and structures.

== See also ==
- Continuity thesis
- Crisis of the Late Middle Ages
- Komnenian restoration
- Carolingian Renaissance
- Ottonian Renaissance
- Renaissance of the 11th century
- Northumbria's Golden Age
- Golden Age of medieval Bulgarian culture
- Macedonian Renaissance
- Palaeologan Renaissance
