= Gilbert de la Porrée =

French theologian (1085–1154)

Gilbert de la Porrée (French: [ʒilbɛʁ də la pɔʁe]; after 1085 – 4 September 1154), also known as Gilbert of Poitiers, Gilbertus Porretanus or Pictaviensis, was a scholastic logician and theologian and Bishop of Poitiers.

== Life ==
He was born in Poitiers, and completed his first studies there. He was then educated under Bernard of Chartres at Chartres, where he was schooled in the differences between the teachings of Aristotle and Plato, and later under Anselm of Laon and Ralph of Laon at Laon, where he studied the Scriptures. After his education, he returned to Poitiers, where it is believed he taught. Subsequently he then returned to Chartres to teach logic and theology and succeeded Bernard of Chartres as Chancellor from 1126 to 1140. He is also known to have lectured in Paris. From a passage from the text, Dialogue with Ratius and Everard, by the Cistercian Everard, it would appear that Gilbert was more popular in Paris than in Chartres. Everard writes that he was the fourth to attend Gilbert's lectures in Chartres and the three hundredth to attend in Paris. One of those attending Gilbert's lectures in Paris, in 1141, was John of Salisbury, who was greatly influenced by them. John would later become chancellor of Chartres and also wrote about Gilbert saying: He taught grammar and theology, and would whip a student who made a grammatical error. If he believed a student was wasting time in class, he would suggest he take up bread making, and last when he lectured he used philosophers, orators and as well as poets to help interpret.

In the 1140s Gilbert published his Commentary on Boethius's, Opuscula Sacra. Although intended as an explanation of what Boethius meant, it interpreted the Holy Trinity in such a way as went against the teachings of the church. In 1142, Gilbert became Bishop of Poitiers, and within the same year two archdeacons, Arnaud and Calon, denounced him for his ideas on the Trinity. It was also in 1142 when Gilbert's teaching post in Chartres was taken over. By 1147, in Paris, Peter Lombard attacked Gilbert for his trinitarian doctrine. In 1148, Saint Bernard of Clairvaux, known as the great detector of heresies, brought Gilbert to trial. Saint Bernard had previously had reasons to believe Gilbert was a heretic because when Abelard was tried and condemned, the school of Chartres, where Gilbert was chancellor at that moment, supported Abelard. Pope Eugene III presided over the trial, during which Gilbert and Bernard were asked to cite and explain specific biblical texts. Bernard, lacking Gilbert's experience of the technique of the schools, was not able to condemn him. It was nevertheless decided to require Gilbert to reformulate parts of his book.

Gilbert died in 1154. He was buried at the Église Saint-Hilaire-le-Grand in Poitiers.

== Works ==
Authentic works

- Commentaria in Boethii opuscula sacra, edited by Nikolaus M. Häring, Toronto: Pontifical Institute of Mediaeval Studies, 1966.
- The Psalms Commentary of Gilbert of Poitiers, edited by T. Gross-Diaz. Leiden: Brill, 1996.

Spurious works

- Hermes Trismegistus, De sex rerum principiis, edited by P. Lucentini and M. Delp, Corpus Christianorum Continuatio Mediaevalis (CCCM 142), Turnhot: Brepols, 2006.

Gilbert is almost the only logician of the 12th century who is quoted by the greater scholastics of the succeeding age. The Liber sex principiorum, attributed to him, but in fact the work of an anonymous author, was regarded with a reverence almost equal to that paid to Aristotle, and furnished matter for numerous commentators, amongst them Albertus Magnus. Owing to the fame of this work, he is mentioned by Dante as the Magister sex principiorum. The treatise itself is a discussion of the Aristotelian categories, specially of the six subordinate modes. The author distinguishes in the ten categories two classes, one essential, the other derivative. Essential or inhering (formae inhaerentes) in the objects themselves are only substance, quantity, quality and relation in the stricter sense of that term. The remaining six, when, where, action, passion, position and habit, are relative and subordinate (formae assistantes). This suggestion has some interest, but is of no great value, either in logic or in the theory of knowledge. More important in the history of scholasticism are the theological consequences to which Gilbert's realism led him.

In the commentary on Boethius' treatise De Trinitate he proceeds from the metaphysical notion that pure or abstract being is prior in nature to that which is. This pure being is God, and must be distinguished from the triune God as known to us. God is incomprehensible, and the categories cannot be applied to determine his existence. In God there is no distinction or difference, whereas in all substances or things there is duality, arising from the element of matter. Between pure being and substances stand the ideas or forms, which subsist, though they are not substances. These forms, when materialized, are called formae substantiales or formae nativae; they are the essences of things, and in themselves have no relation to the accidents of things. Things are temporal, the ideas perpetual, God eternal. The pure form of existence, that by which God is God, must be distinguished from the three persons who are God by participation in this form. The form or essence is one, the persons or substances three. This distinction clearly goes against the church's tenet of divine simplicity. It was this distinction between Deitas or Divinitas and Deus that led to the condemnation of Gilbert's doctrine.
