= Alberic of Paris =

Alberic of Paris was a teacher of logic in Paris in the 1130s and 1140s. He was a major critic of Peter Abelard. No writings attributed to him are extant, but he is regularly cited by contemporary logicians. His followers were known as the Albricani.

The only source for Alberic's biography is John of Salisbury's Metalogicon. According to John, Alberic came to Paris around 1136 and attended Abelard's lectures on the Montagne Sainte-Geneviève. After Abelard left Paris, John attended lectures given by Alberic. Alberic left Paris for the University of Bologna before 1142. He returned to Paris only after 1146 (and before John wrote the Metalogicon in 1159). Upon his return, he rejected his former teaching and adopted a new one opposed to Abelard's.

== Bibliography ==
- De Rijk, Lambertus Marie (1962). Logica Modernorum: A Contribution to the History of Early Terminist Logic. Vol. 1: On the Twelfth Century Theories of Fallacy. Van Gorcum.
- Estrada-González, Luis; Ramírez-Cámara, Elisángela (2020). "A Nelsonian Response to 'the most embarrassing of all twelfth-century arguments'". History and Philosophy of Logic. 41 (2): 101–113.
- Hansen, Heine (2022). "This Woman Is a Father? The Albricani on a Puzzle about Relations". Vivarium. 60 (2–3): 248–270. doi:10.1163/15685349-06002006.
- Heine Hansen; Enrico Donato; Boaz Faraday Schuman, eds. (2026). Twelfth-Century Logic and Metaphysics: Alberic of Paris and His Contemporaries. Brill.
- Iwakuma, Yukio (2013). "Alberic of Paris on Mont Ste Geneviève against Peter Abelard". In Jakob Leth Fink; Heine Hansen; Ana María Mora-Marquez (eds.). Logic and Language in the Middle Ages: A Volume in Honour of Sten Ebbesen. Brill. pp. 27–47.
- Marenbon, John (2010). "Alberic of Paris". In Robert E. Bjork (ed.). The Oxford Dictionary of the Middle Ages. Oxford University Press.
- Martin, Christopher J. (2004). "Logic". In Jeffrey E. Brower; Kevin Guilfoy (eds.). The Cambridge Companion to Abelard. Cambridge University Press. pp. 158–199.
- Martin, Christopher J. (2012). "Logical Consequence". In John Marenbon (ed.). The Oxford Handbook of Medieval Philosophy. Oxford University Press. pp. 289–311.
- Schuman, Boaz Faraday (2024). "Do Thoughts Have Parts? Peter Abelard: Yes! Alberic of Paris: No!". British Journal for the History of Philosophy. 32 (5): 974–998.
