= Saint-Martin-du-Tilleul =

- Commune
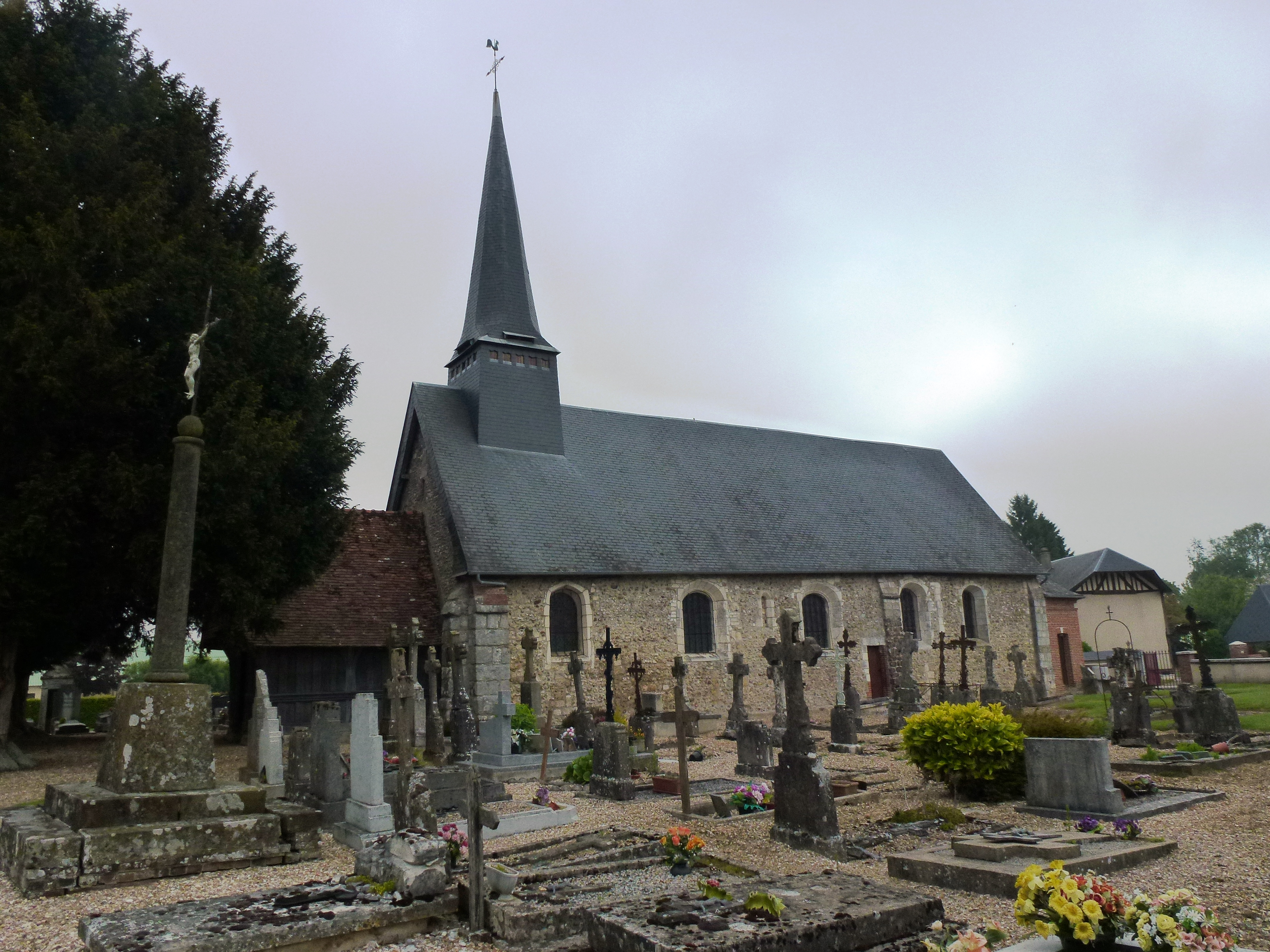
- St Germanus's Church, St-Martin-du-Tilleul
- Location of Saint-Martin-du-Tilleul
- Location within France Location within Normandy
- Coordinates: 49°06′38″N 0°31′54″E
- Country: France
- Region: Normandy
- Department: Eure
- Arrondissement: Bernay
- Canton: Bernay

Government
  - Mayor (2020–2026): Jacques Vieren
- Area^{1}: 5.15 km^{2} (1.99 sq mi)
- Elevation: 147 m (482 ft)
- Highest elevation: 181 m (594 ft)
- Lowest elevation: 145 m (476 ft)
- Population (2023): 243
  - Density: 47.2/km^{2} (122/sq mi)
- Time zone: UTC+01:00 (CET)
  - Summer (DST): UTC+02:00 (CEST)
- INSEE/Postal code: 27569 /27300
- ^{1} French Land Register data, which excludes lakes, ponds, glaciers > 1 km^{2} (0.386 sq mi or 247 acres) and river estuaries.

Saint-Martin-du-Tilleul (French pronunciation: [sɛ̃ maʁtɛ̃ dy tijœl]) is a commune in the Eure department in Normandy in northern France. It includes the former parish of Tilleul-Folenfant.

== History ==
St Germanus's Church (Église St-Germain du Tilleul-Fol-Enfant) was the burial site of the prominent Scholastic philosopher William of Conches, causing Antoine Charma to argue for the village as his actual place of birth. The tomb's funeral slab with William's effigy has since been moved to St Faith's Church in nearby Conches, however, in keeping with his usual association to it.

== Population ==
Historical population
| Year | Pop. | ±% p.a. |
|---|---|---|
| 1968 | 173 | — |
| 1975 | 226 | +3.89% |
| 1982 | 177 | −3.43% |
| 1990 | 260 | +4.92% |
| 1999 | 269 | +0.38% |
| 2007 | 241 | −1.36% |
| 2012 | 260 | +1.53% |
| 2017 | 240 | −1.59% |
| 2023 | 243 | +0.21% |
Source: INSEE

== See also ==
- Communes of the Eure department
