= Policraticus =

Work by John of Salisbury

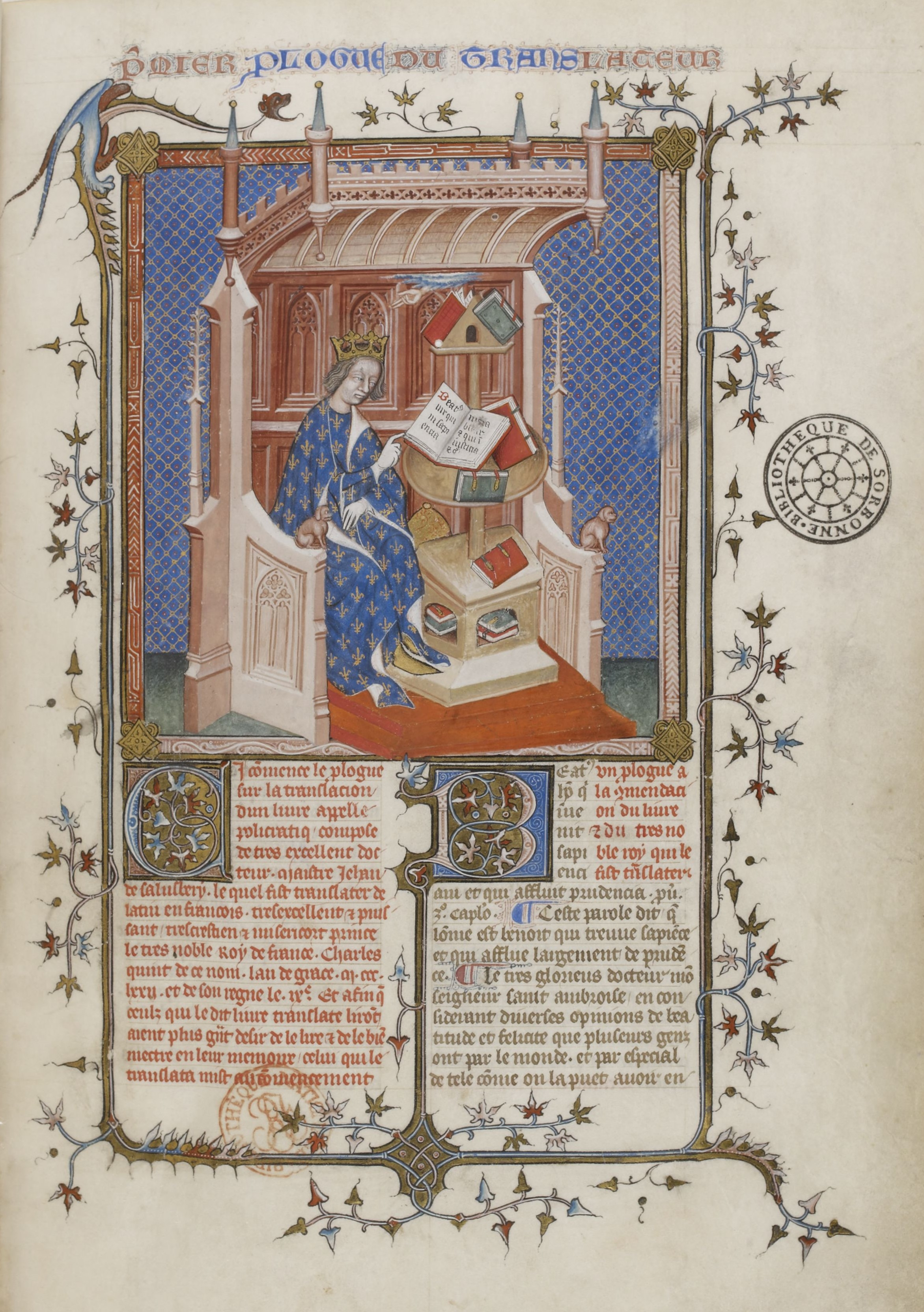
The beginning of the preface to Denis Foulechat’s French translation of John of Salisbury's Policraticus. 14th century manuscript.

Policraticus or Polycraticus is a work by John of Salisbury, written around 1159. Sometimes called the first complete medieval work of political theory, it belongs, at least in part, to the genre of advice literature addressed to rulers known as "mirrors for princes", but also breaks from that genre by offering advice to courtiers and bureaucrats. Though it takes up a wide variety of ethical questions, it is most famous for attempting to define the responsibilities of kings and their relationship to their subjects.

== Title ==
The title Policraticus, like those of other works by John of Salisbury, is a Greco-Latin neologism, sometimes rendered as "The Statesman's Book". Its original subtitle was De nugis curialium et uestigiis philosophorum, "On the Frivolities of Courtiers and the Footprints of Philosophers".

== Structure ==
The work consists of eight books, falling roughly into three 'blocks': the private 'frivolities' of the courtiers (books I-III), the public offices of different classes, with a focus on the prince and the body politic (books IV-VI), and the 'footprints' of the philosophers (books VII and VIII). Most scholarly attention of the work has focused on the 'political' content of the second block and the discussion of tyranny in the final book.

The topics of the books are as follows:

- Book I: Hunting, theatre, and magic
- Book II: Omens, dreams, and occult sciences
- Book III: Self-interest and flattery
- Book IV: The duties of the 'prince' (princeps)
- Book V and VI: The body politic
- Book VII: Three Epicurean tendencies (according to Boethius)
- Book VIII: Another two Epicurean tendencies; Tyranny

== Arguments ==
=== Monarchy ===
John drew his arguments primarily from the Bible and from Roman law, especially Justinian's Code and Novels. He depicted "the prince" as a "likeness on earth of the divine majesty", "feared by each of those over whom he is set as an object of fear". The prince's power, like all earthly authority, was "from God", requiring the obedience of the prince's subjects. Purportedly following a manual by Plutarch titled the Institutio Traiani—likely invented by John himself—he argued that the prince had four principal responsibilities: to revere God, adore his subjects, exert self-discipline and instruct his ministers. Since the ruler was the image of God, John advocated strict punishments for lèse-majesté, but he qualified this by specifying that the temporal power of the ruler was delegated by the spiritual power of the church, and argued that a prince should err on the side of mercy and compassion when enforcing the law.

=== Tyrannicide ===
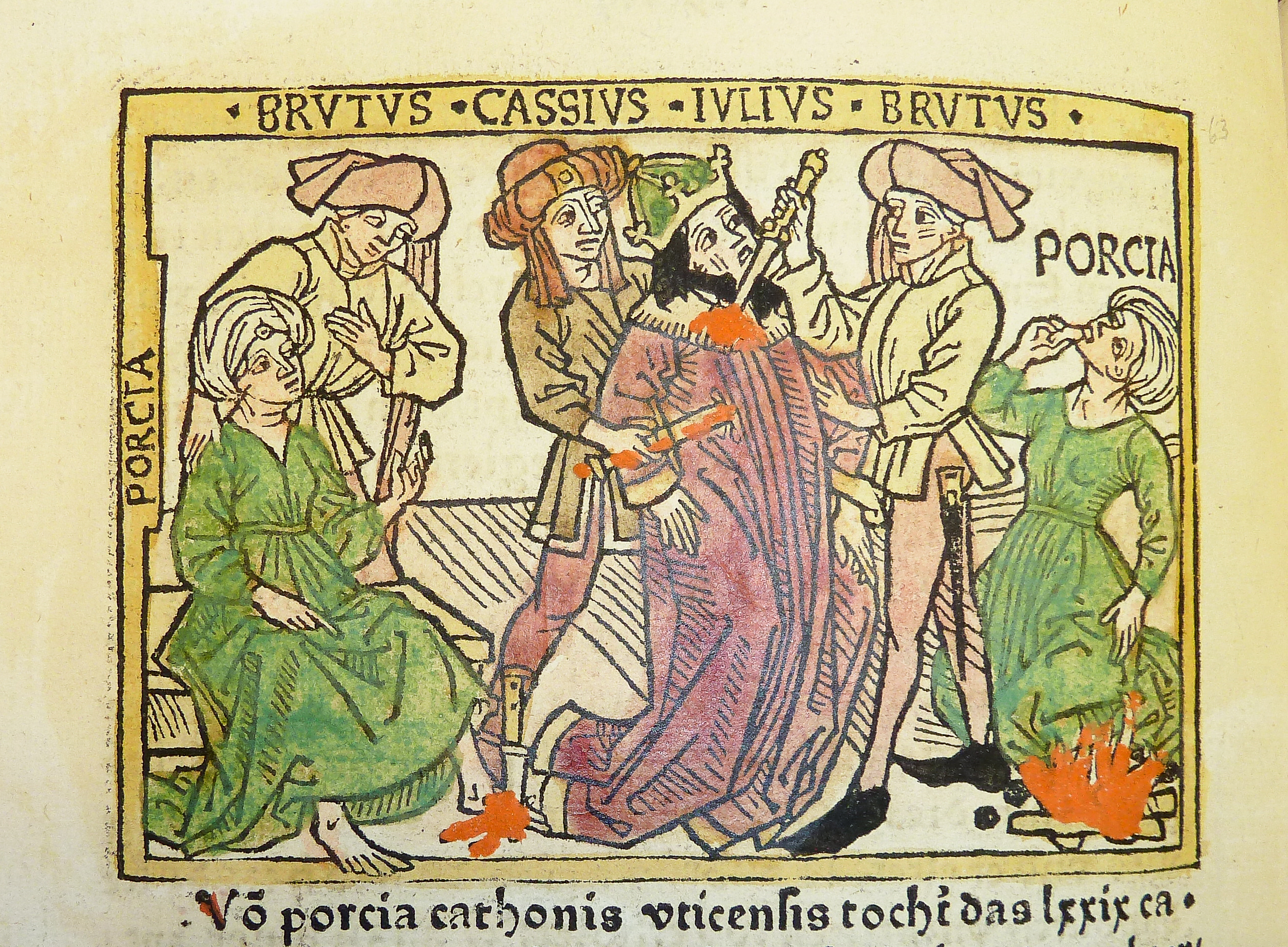
The murder of Julius Caesar - an incident discussed in Polycraticus. From a 1474 incunable.

John argued that princes must be subordinate to the law, and distinguished the prince from the tyrant on the basis that the prince "obeys the law and rules the people by its dictates, accounting himself as but their servant". The "limbs" of the body politic could be in subjection to the "head", the monarch, "always and only on condition that religion be kept inviolate".

The tyrant's resistance of divine law, on the other hand, could merit his death. John's examples of tyrants included the scriptural figures of Sisera and Holofernes, as well as the Roman emperor Julian the Apostate, who attempted to restore Rome's pagan religion. In cases such as these, John argued that killing a ruler, when all other resources were exhausted, was not only justifiable but necessary. Where the prince was an image of God, the tyrant was an "image of depravity", "for the most part even to be killed". The "tree" of tyranny" is to be cut down by an axe anywhere it grows". This was the first systematic defense of tyrannicide to be written after antiquity.

== Modern editions and translations ==
=== Critical editions ===
- Policraticus, ed. K. S. B. Keats-Rohan, CCCM 118 (Turnholt, 1993). Books I-IV.
- Policratici, sive, De nugis curialium et vestigiis philosophorum, ed. Clement Webb (Oxford, 1909). Books I-VIII.

=== English translations ===
No complete English translation of all eight books of the Policraticus currently exists. Translated selections may be found in:

- The Statesman's Book of John of Salisbury, trans. John Dickinson (New York, 1927). (Contains books IV-VI, with selections from VII and VIII.)
- Frivolities of Courtiers and Footprints of Philosophers, trans. Joseph B. Pike (Minneapolis and London, 1938). (Contains books I-III, selections of VII and VIII.)
- Policraticus: Of the Frivolities of Courtiers and the Footprints of Philosophers, trans. Cary J. Nederman (Cambridge, 1990). (Contains various selections, mostly from books IV-VIII.
