= John of Salisbury =

12th-century English philosopher (late 1110s–1180)

- Bishop of Chartres
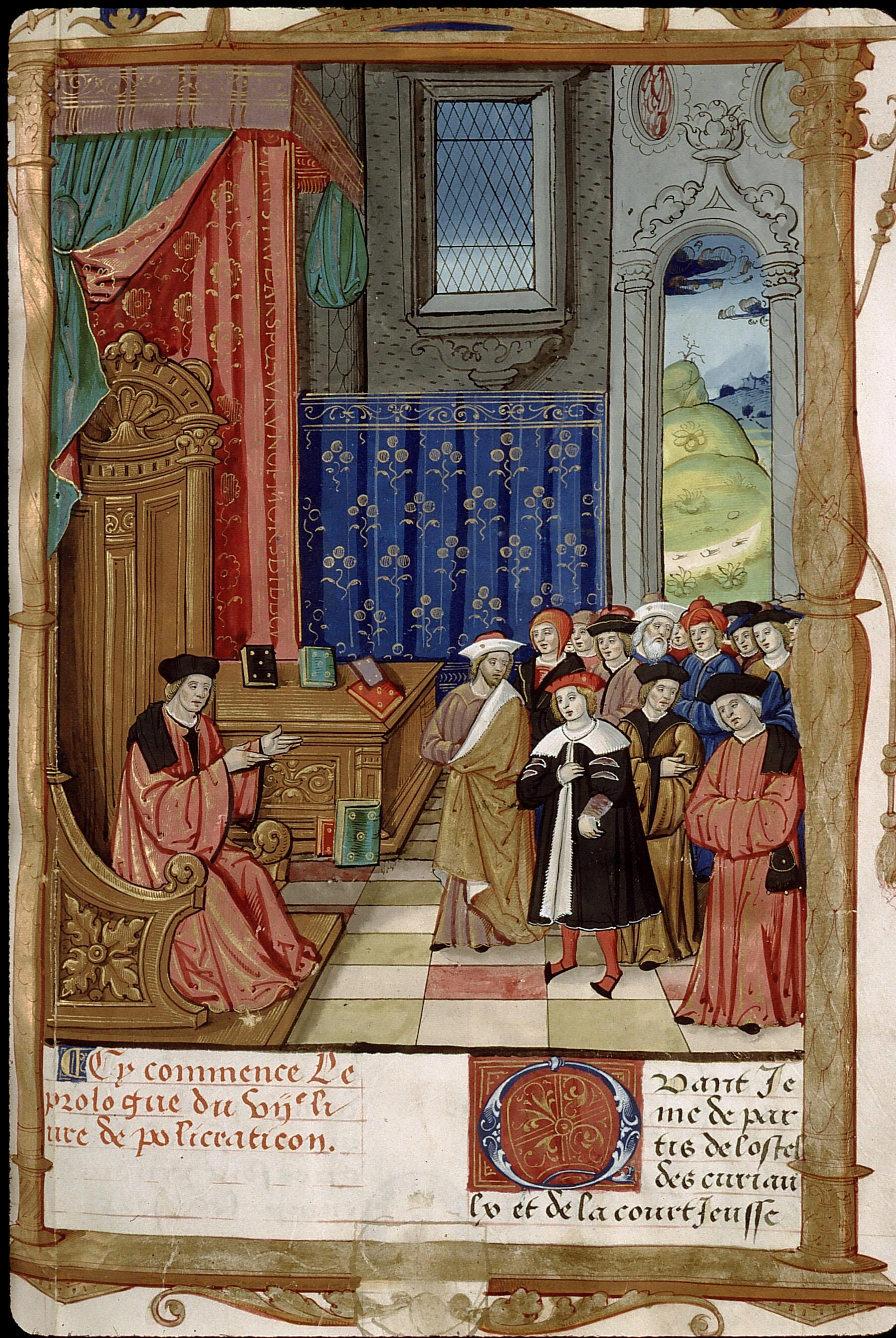
- John of Salisbury teaching philosophy
- Diocese: Chartres
- Appointed: 1176

Personal details
- Born: late 1110s Salisbury, England
- Died: 25 October 1180 Chartres, France
- Occupation: author; philosopher; educationalist; diplomat

John of Salisbury (late 1110s – 25 October 1180), who described himself as Johannes Parvus ("John the Little"), was an English author, philosopher, educationalist, diplomat and bishop of Chartres. The historian Hans Liebeschuetz described him as one of the most notable figures of the "medieval Renaissance" of the 12th century.

== Early life and education ==
Born at Salisbury, England, he was of Anglo-Saxon rather than of Norman extraction, and therefore apparently a clerk from a modest background, whose career depended upon his education. Beyond that, and the fact that he applied to himself the cognomen of Parvus, meaning "short" or "small", few details are known regarding his early life. From his own statements it is gathered that he crossed to France about 1136, and began regular studies in Paris under Peter Abelard, who had for a brief period re-opened his famous school there on Montagne Sainte-Geneviève.

His vivid accounts of teachers and students provide some of the most valuable insights into the early days of the University of Paris. When Abelard withdrew from Paris, John studied under Master Alberic and Robert of Melun. In 1137, John went to Chartres, where he studied grammar under William of Conches, and rhetoric, logic and the classics under Richard l'Evêque, a disciple of Bernard of Chartres. Bernard's teaching was distinguished partly by its pronounced Platonic tendency, and partly by the stress laid upon literary study of the greater Latin writers. The influence of the latter feature is noticeable in all of John of Salisbury's works.

Around 1140 John returned to Paris to study theology under Gilbert de la Porrée, then under Robert Pullus and Simon of Poissy, supporting himself as a tutor to young noblemen. In 1148, he resided at the Abbey of Moutiers-la-Celle in the diocese of Troyes, with his friend Peter of Celle. He was present at the Council of Reims in 1148, presided over by Pope Eugene III. It is conjectured that while there, he was introduced by St. Bernard of Clairvaux to Theobald, whose secretary he became.

== Secretary to the Archbishop of Canterbury ==
John of Salisbury was secretary to Archbishop Theobald for seven years. While at Canterbury he became acquainted with Thomas Becket, one of the significant potent influences in John's life. During this period he went on many missions to the Papal See; it was probably on one of these that he made the acquaintance of Nicholas Breakspear, who in 1154 became Pope Adrian IV. The following year John visited him, remaining at Benevento with him for several months. He was at the court of Rome at least twice afterward.

During this time John composed his greatest works, published almost certainly in 1159, the Policraticus, sive de nugis curialium et de vestigiis philosophorum and the Metalogicon, writings invaluable as storehouses of information regarding the matter and form of scholastic education, and remarkable for their cultivated style and humanist tendency. The Policraticus also sheds light on the decadence of the 12th-century court manners and the lax morals of royalty. The idea of contemporaries "standing on the shoulders of giants" of Antiquity, attributed by him to Bernard of Chartres, first appears in written form in the Metalogicon. The Metalogicon consists of four books starting with defending the trivium and extending further to comments on other areas of logic. John defends the trivium by stating socialization is a critical part of human nature and well-being, while in the past Cornificius and his followers argued verbal arts should not be included in logic as they are nearly "useless". After the death of Theobald in 1161, John continued as secretary to his successor, Thomas Becket, and took an active part in the long disputes between that primate and his sovereign, Henry II, who looked upon John as a papal agent.

John's letters throw light on the constitutional struggle then agitating England. In 1163, John fell into disfavour with the king for reasons that remain obscure, and withdrew to France. The next six years he spent with his friend Peter of La Celle, now Abbot of St. Remigius at Reims. Here he wrote "Historia Pontificalis". In 1170, he led the delegation charged with preparing for Becket's return to England, and was in Canterbury at the time of Becket's assassination. In 1174, John became treasurer of Exeter cathedral.

== Bishop of Chartres ==
In 1176, he was made bishop of Chartres, where he passed the remainder of his life. In 1179, he took an active part in the Third Council of the Lateran. He died at or near Chartres on 25 October 1180.

== Scholarship and influences ==
Many of John's works were not valued during his time. Many survived only because they were copied into manuscripts that contained more popular works. It is still being disputed whether certain works were authored by John of Salisbury. John's writings are excellent at clarifying the literary and scientific position of 12th-century Western Europe. Though he was well versed in the new logic and dialectical rhetoric of the university, John's views also imply a cultivated intelligence well versed in practical affairs, opposing to the extremes of both nominalism and realism a practical common sense. His doctrine draws on the literary skepticism of Cicero, for whom he had unbounded admiration and on whose style he based his own. His view that the end of education was moral, rather than merely intellectual, became one of the prime educational doctrines of Western civilization. This moral vision of education shares more in common with the tradition of monastic education which preceded his own Scholastic age, and with the vision of education which re-emerges in the worldview of Renaissance humanism.

Of Greek writers he appears to have known nothing at first hand, and very little in translations, but he was one of the best Latinists of his age. The Timaeus of Plato in the Latin version of Chalcidius was known to him as to his contemporaries and predecessors, and probably he had access to translations of the Phaedo and Meno. Of Aristotle he possessed the whole of the Organon in Latin; he is, indeed, the first of the medieval writers of note to whom the whole was known.

He first coined the term theatrum mundi, a notion that influences the theater several centuries later. In several chapters of the third book of his Policraticus, he meditates on the fact that "the life of man on earth is a comedy, where each forgetting his own plays another's role".

=== Philosophical views ===
John of Salisbury was a follower of the Ciceronian perspective. Followers of this perspective believed that things could be definitively proven, but still left open to be challenged. John emphasized this belief in both the Policraticus and the Metalogicon. Following the worldview of Cicero, John of Salisbury dissociated himself from the extreme skepticism some of his fellow academics held. John instead held the view of moderate skepticism. In this worldview, there are three bases for which knowledge can be based in certainty. These bases are: Faith, reason, and the senses. This structure allowed for philosophers to think and discuss without having to question the existence of God or question other structures which were to not be questioned in their time.

John of Salisbury's belief of moderate skepticism carried over into his other views of life. John detested the philosophy of Epicureanism, deeming it to be the opposite of moderation. John found some values in the teaching of Epicurus, but his criticisms were more directed to the followers of Epicureanism. He believed that Epicureans didn't correctly follow Epicurus's original philosophy and used it to indulge in unbridled hedonism. John argued that this form of Epicureanism would not allow its followers to achieve true happiness. John of Salisbury also criticized Epicureans who did not identify themselves as such. This pertained to individuals who were overly hedonistic and only ever served their own needs. Having not had wide access to ancient philosophers who challenged Epicurus's ideas, it is most likely that John of Salisbury came to his conclusions based on his own life experiences and observations. Similarly to the Epicureans, John also detested the philosophies of Cornificius and his followers. However, he detested their philosophies because they attempted to reject the trivium.

However, John viewed the presence of any philosophical thought in humans as critical, despite his criticisms of certain philosophies. John believed that the capacity for logic was a natural dividing line between humans and lesser-sentient creatures. He stated that philosophy was essential to human health and mental well-being, while humans lacking philosophical thought were akin to feral creatures incapable of rationalization. This is also why John argued so strongly for the trivium, viewing socialization as an important aspect of sharing and enhancing philosophical thought—also contributing to well-being.

=== Medical views ===
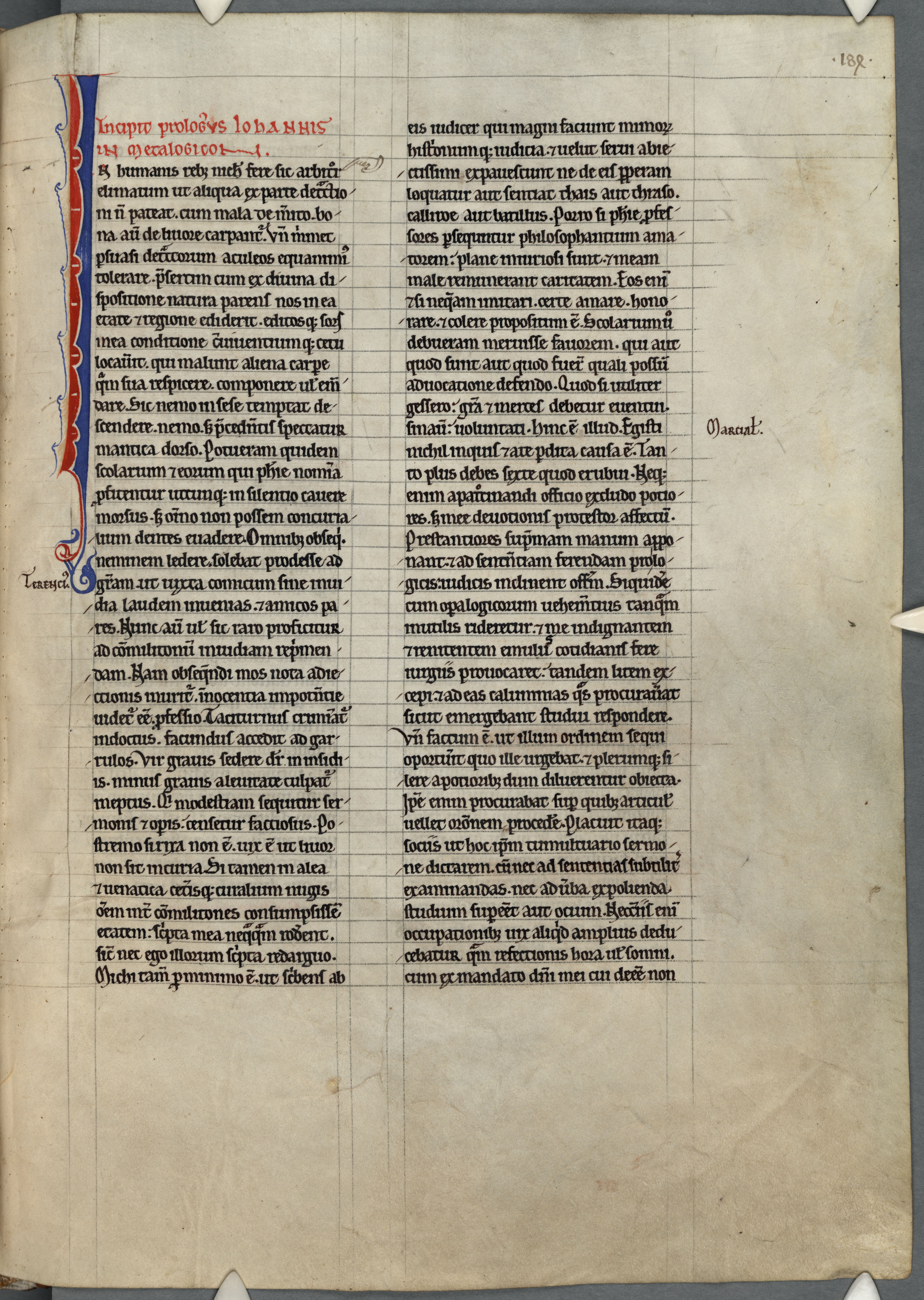
A page from the Metalogicon

John of Salisbury was fairly vocal about his criticisms of the medical system during his time, writing about it in both the Policraticus and the Metalogicon. He expressed his belief that medical science should have more balance between theory and practice; and his concern that the medical system had become corrupt. John of Salisbury believed medical science was important; however, he criticized the physicians practicing medicine for being seemingly more focused on personal gain than helping patients. Physicians who relied too much on inquiry began speculating about how the soul relates to health, which John believed impractical because it could not be tested and trespassed on religious belief. John believed, as a result, that theoretical physicians often ignored natural, tangible causes of illness in the body. On the other hand, he stated practical physicians chose to ignore their potential faults and chance for inquiry; making the claim that there is nothing they could have done better or differently if their patient succumbed to their illness. John argued instead that there should be an equal balance between seeking out new truths and practicing or pursuing those new truths. Due to the progressing division between the two types of physicians, John of Salisbury also argued they had begun diversifying the medical language used to a point where it was becoming more confusing than beneficial to clients. John posed the argument that physicians should focus more on a balance of both inquiry and practice while using a set of steps for treatment he coined as the "regularum compendium": find the source of the illness, focus on healing the illness, and then perform aftercare to restore the health of the patient and prevent future illnesses from surfacing in the first place.

== Fictional portrayals ==
John was portrayed by actor Alex G. Hunter in the 1924 silent film Becket, based on the play of the same title by Alfred Lord Tennyson.

== Works ==
Latin text

- John of Salisbury (1639) [1159]. Policraticus: sive de nugis curialium et vestigiis philosophorum, libri octo accedit huic editioni ejusdem metalogicus (in Latin). Lugduni Batavorum: ex officina Ioannis Maire.
- Metalogicon, edited by J.B. Hall & Katharine S.B. Keats-Rohan, Corpus Christianorum Continuatio Mediaevalis (CCCM 98), Turnhout, Brepols 1991.

Latin text and English translations

- Anselm & Becket. Two Canterbury Saints' Lives by John of Salisbury, Ronald E. Pepin (transl.) Turnhout, 2009, Brepols Publishers,ISBN 978-0-88844-298-7
- The Letters of John of Salisbury, 2 vols., ed. and trans. W. J. Millor and H. E. Butler (Oxford: Oxford University Press, 1979–86)
- Historia Pontificalis, ed. and trans. Marjorie Chibnall (Oxford: Oxford University Press, 1986)
- John of Salisbury's Entheticus maior and minor, ed. and trans. Jan van Laarhoven [Studien und Texte zur Geistesgeschichte des Mittelalters 17] (Leiden: Brill, 1987)

English translations

- John of Salisbury (1990) [1159]. Nederman, Cary J (ed.). Policraticus, sive de nugis curialium et de vestigiis philosophorum [Policraticus: Of the frivolities of courtiers and the footprints of philosophers]. Cambridge University Press. ISBN 0-521-36399-3. (full text on Internet Archive) somewhat abridged
- — (1938) [1159]. Pike, Joseph B (ed.). Frivolities of courtiers and footprints of philosophers: being a translation of the first, second, and third books and selections from the seventh and eighth books of the Policraticus of John of Salisbury. Minneapolis: The University of Minnesota Press. (full text on Internet Archive)
- The statesman’s book of John of Salisbury; being the fourth, fifth, and sixth books, and selections from the seventh and eighth books, of the Policraticus, trans. John Dickinson (New York: Knopf, 1927)
- The Metalogicon, A Twelfth-Century Defense of the Verbal and Logical Arts of the Trivium, trans. Daniel McGarry (Berkeley: University of California Press, 1955)
- Metalogicon, translated by J.B. Hall, Corpus Christianorum in Translation (CCT 12), Turnhout, Brepols, 2013.

Studies

- A Companion to John of Salisbury, ed. Christophe Grellard and Frédérique Lachaud, Leiden, Brill, Brill's Companions to the Christian Tradition, 57, 2014 (copyright 2015), 480 p. (ISBN 9789004265103)
- Michael Wilks (ed.), The World of John of Salisbury, Oxford, Blackwell, 1997.
- John D. Hosler, John of Salisbury: Military Authority of the Twelfth-Century Renaissance, Leiden, Brill, 2013, 240 p. (ISBN 9789004226630)

English excerpts of John's political theory

- Policraticus, IV, selections
- Policraticus, VI, 24

== Sources ==
Attribution

- This article incorporates text from a publication now in the public domain: Chisholm, Hugh, ed. (1911). "John of Salisbury". Encyclopædia Britannica. Vol. 15 (11th ed.). Cambridge University Press. pp. 449–450.
- Lane-Poole, Reginald (1892). "John of Salisbury" . In Lee, Sidney (ed.). Dictionary of National Biography. Vol. 29. London: Smith, Elder & Co.
- Coffey, Peter (1910). "John of Salisbury" . In Herbermann, Charles (ed.). Catholic Encyclopedia. Vol. 8. New York: Robert Appleton Company.
- Luscombe, David. "Salisbury, John of (late 1110s–1180)". Oxford Dictionary of National Biography (online ed.). Oxford University Press. doi:10.1093/ref:odnb/14849. (Subscription, Wikipedia Library access or UK public library membership required.)
