= Bernard of Chartres =

French Neo-Platonist philosopher (died after 1124)

Bernard of Chartres (Latin: Bernardus Carnotensis; died after 1124) was a twelfth-century French Neo-Platonist philosopher, scholar, and administrator.

== Life ==
The date and place of his birth are unknown. He was previously believed to have been the elder brother of Thierry of Chartres and to be of Breton origin, but research has shown that this is unlikely. He is recorded at the cathedral school of Chartres by 1115 and was chancellor until 1124. There is no proof that he was still alive after 1124.

== Contemporary accounts ==
Gilbert de la Porrée and William of Conches were students of his, and their writings reference his work, as do the writings of John of Salisbury. According to the latter, Bernard composed a prose treatise named De expositione Porphyrii, a metrical treatise on the same subject, a moral poem on education, and probably a fourth work seeking to reconcile Plato and Aristotle. Fragments of these treatises are found in John's Metalogicon (IV, 35) and Policraticus (VII, 3). Hauréau confounds Bernard of Chartres with Bernardus Silvestris, and assigns to the former works which are to be ascribed to the latter.

The earliest attribution of the phrase "standing on the shoulders of giants" is to Bernard (by John of Salisbury):

Bernard of Chartres used to say that we [the Moderns] are like dwarves perched on the shoulders of giants [the Ancients], and thus we are able to see more and farther than the latter. And this is not at all because of the acuteness of our sight or the stature of our body, but because we are carried aloft and elevated by the magnitude of the giants.

== Doctrines ==
Bernard, like others of his school, studied the Timaeus and the Neo-Platonists more than Aristotle's dialectical treatises and Boethius's commentaries. Consequently, he not only discussed the problem of universals (distinguishing between the abstract, the process, and the concrete—exemplified, for instance, by the Latin words albedo, albet, and album) but also addressed problems of metaphysics and cosmology.

=== Metaphysics ===
According to Bernard, there are three categories of reality: God, matter, and idea. God is supreme reality. Matter was brought out of nothingness by God's creative act and is the element which, in union with Ideas, constitutes the world of sensible things. Ideas are the prototypes by means of which the world was from all eternity present to the Divine Mind; they constitute the world of Providence ("in qua omnia semel et simul fecit Deus"), and are eternal but not coeternal with God. According to John of Salisbury, Bernard also taught that there exist native forms—copies of the Ideas created with matter—which are alone united with matter. It is difficult, however, to determine what was Bernard's doctrine on this point. It is sufficient to note that he reproduced in his metaphysical doctrines many of the characteristic traits of Platonism and Neo-Platonism: the intellect as the habitat of Ideas, the world-soul, eternal matter, matter as the source of imperfection, etc.

=== Cosmology ===
Bernard argued that matter, although caused by God, existed from all eternity. In the beginning, before its union with the Ideas, it was in a chaotic condition. It was by means of the native forms, which penetrate matter, that distinction, order, regularity, and number were introduced into the universe.

== Glosses on Plato's Timaeus ==
Paul Edward Dutton has shown that a set of anonymous glosses on Plato's Timaeus must be attributed to Bernard. These glosses edited by Dutton are Bernard's only extant work.

== Editions ==
- The Glosae super Platonem of Bernard of Chartres, edited with an introduction by Paul Edward Dutton, Toronto 1991. ISBN 0-88844-107-X

== Sources ==
- Chisholm, Hugh, ed. (1911). "Bernard of Chartres" . Encyclopædia Britannica. Vol. 3 (11th ed.). Cambridge University Press.
- Turner, William (1912). "Bernard Sylvester" . In Herbermann, Charles (ed.). Catholic Encyclopedia. Vol. 14. New York: Robert Appleton Company.
