= Judeo-Islamic philosophies (800–1400) =

This article covers the conversations between Jewish philosophy and Islamic philosophy, and mutual influence on each other in response to questions and challenges brought into wide circulation through Aristotelianism, Neo-platonism, and the Kalam, focusing especially on the period from 800–1400 CE.

== Freedom versus fatalism and the Kalam ==
A century after the Qur'an was written, numerous religious schisms arose in Islam. Skeptics sought to investigate the doctrines of the Qur'an, which until then had been accepted as divine revelation. The first independent protest was that of the Qadar ("Destiny"), whose partisans affirmed the freedom of the will, in contrast with the Jabarites (jabar, force, constraint), who maintained the traditional belief in fatalism.

In the second century of the Hijrah, a schism arose in the theological schools of Basra, over which Hasan al-Basri presided. A pupil, Wasil ibn Ata, who was expelled from the school because his answers were contrary to tradition, proclaimed himself leader of a new school, and systematized all the radical opinions of preceding sects, particularly those of the Kadarites. This new school or sect was called Mutazilites (from 'tazala, to separate oneself, to dissent). The sect had three principal dogmas: (1) God is an absolute unity, and no attribute can be ascribed to Him. (2) Man is a free agent. Because of these two principles the Mutazilites designate themselves the "AsḦab al-'Adl w'al TauḦid" (The Partisans of Justice and Unity). (3) All knowledge necessary for the salvation of man emanates from his reason; he could acquire knowledge before as well as after Revelation, by the sole light of reason—a fact which, therefore, makes knowledge obligatory upon all men and women, at all times, and in all places.

The Mutazilites, compelled to defend their principles against the orthodox Islamic faith, looked for support to the doctrines of philosophy, and thus founded a rational theology, which they designated " 'Ilm-al-Kalam"; and those professing it were called Motekallamin. This appellation, originally designating the Mutazilites, soon became the common name for all seeking philosophical demonstration in confirmation of religious principles. The first Motekallamin had to combat both the orthodox and the infidel parties, between whom they occupied the middle ground; but the efforts of subsequent generations were entirely concentrated against the philosophers. The later Motekallamin formed a school known as Ash'arism, which regarded itself as the champion of orthodoxy, and references by the later philosophers to "Motekallamin" (theologians) should usually be taken as meaning the Ash'arites.

From the ninth century onward, owing to Caliph al-Ma'mun and his successor, Greek philosophy was introduced among the Arabs, and the Peripatetic school began to find able representatives among them; such were Al-Kindi, Al-Farabi, Ibn Sina, and Ibn Roshd, all of whose fundamental principles were considered as heresies by the Motekallamin.

== Argument for creation against the Peripatetics ==
Aristotle, the prince of the philosophers, demonstrated the necessary existence of the unmoved mover, and therefore the unity of God, but from the view which he maintained, that matter was eternal, it followed that God could not be the Creator of the world. Again, to assert, as the Peripatetics did, that God's knowledge extends only to the general laws of the universe, and not to individual and accidental things, is tantamount to giving denial to prophecy. One other point shocked the faith of the Motekallamin—the theory of the intellect. The Peripatetics taught that the human soul was only an aptitude—a faculty capable of attaining every variety of passive perfection—and that through information and virtue it became qualified for union with the active intellect, which latter emanates from God. To admit this theory would be to deny the immortality of the soul (see Alexander of Aphrodisias).

Wherefore the Motekallamin had, before anything else, to establish a system of philosophy to demonstrate the creation of matter, and they adopted to that end the theory of atoms as enunciated by Democritus. They taught that atoms possess neither quantity nor extension. Originally atoms were created by God, and are created now as occasion seems to require. Bodies come into existence or die, through the aggregation or the sunderance of these atoms. But this theory did not remove the objections of philosophy to a creation of matter. For, indeed, if it be supposed that God commenced His work at a certain definite time by His "will," and for a certain definite object, it must be admitted that He was imperfect before accomplishing His will, or before attaining His object. In order to obviate this difficulty, the Motekallamin extended their theory of the atoms to Time, and claimed that just as Space is constituted of atoms and vacuum, Time, likewise, is constituted of small indivisible moments. The creation of the world once established, it was an easy matter for them to demonstrate the existence of a Creator, and that He is unique, omnipotent, and omniscient.

Toward the middle of the eighth century a dissenting sect—still in existence to-day—called Karaites, arose in Judaism. In order to give a philosophical tinge to their polemics with their opponents, they borrowed the dialectic forms of the Motekallamin, and even adopted their name (Mas'udi, in "Notices et Extraits des Manuscrits de la Bibliothèque Royale," viii. 349–351), and thus transplanted the Kalam gradually to Jewish soil, to undergo the same transformations there as among the Arabs.

== Saadia Gaon ==
One of the most important early Jewish philosophers influenced by Islamic philosophy is Saadia Gaon (892–942). His most important work is Emunoth ve-Deoth (Book of Beliefs and Opinions). In this work Saadia treats of the questions that interested the Motekallamin so deeply—such as the creation of matter, the unity of God, the divine attributes, the soul, etc. — and he criticizes the philosophers severely.

For Saadia creation is not problematic: God created the world ex nihilo, just as Scripture attests; and he contests the theory of the Motekallamin in reference to atoms, which theory, he declares, is just as contrary to reason and religion as the theory of the philosophers professing the eternity of matter. To prove the unity of God, Saadia uses the demonstrations of the Motekallamin. Only the attributes of essence (sifat-al-datiat) can be ascribed to God, but not the attributes of action (sifat-al-af'aliyat). The soul is a substance more delicate even than that of the celestial spheres. Here Saadia contradicts the Motekallamin, who considered the soul an "accident" (compare "Moreh," i. 74), and employs the following one of their premises to justify his position: "Only a substance can be the substratum of an accident" (that is, of a non-essential property of things). Saadia argues: "If the soul be an accident only, it can itself have no such accidents as wisdom, joy, love," etc. Saadia was thus in every way a supporter of the Kalam; and if at times he deviated from its doctrines, it was owing to his religious views; just as the Jewish and Muslim Peripatetics stopped short in their respective Aristotelianism whenever there was danger of wounding orthodox religion.

== Neoplatonic philosophy ==
Jewish philosophy entered upon a new period in the eleventh century. The works of the Peripatetics —Al-Farabi and Ibn Sina (Avicenna)—on the one side, and the "Encyclopedia of the Brethren of Purity"—a transformed Kalam founded on Neoplatonic theories—on the other side, exercised considerable influence upon Jewish thinkers of that age. The two leading philosophers of the period are Ibn Gabirol (Avicebron) and Bahya ibn Pakuda — the former standing upon a purely philosophical platform, the latter upon a religio-philosophical one; and both attaining similar results. Both believe in a universal matter as the substratum of all (except God) that exists; but Bahya goes further and determines what that matter is: it is Darkness ("Ma'ani al-Nafs," translated by Broydé, p. 17). But this matter did not exist from all eternity, as the Peripatetics claimed. It is easy to perceive here the growth of the Peripatetic ideas as to substance and form; but influenced by religion, these ideas are so shaped as to admit the non-eternity of matter. In all that pertains to the soul and its action, Gabirol and Bahya are undoubtedly influenced by the "Brethren of Purity." Man (the microcosm) is in every way like the celestial spheres (the macrocosm). Just as the heavenly spheres receive their motion from the universal soul—which is a simple substance emanating from God—so man receives his motion from the rational soul—another simple substance emanating from Him.

In fact, creation came through emanation, and in the following sequence: (1) The active intellect; (2) the universal soul—which moves the heavenly sphere; (3) nature; (4) darkness—which at the beginning was but a capacity to receive form; (5) the celestial spheres; (6) the heavenly bodies; (7) fire; (8) air; (9) water; (10) earth ("Ma'ani al-Nafs," 72; compare Munk, l.c., p. 201). But as regards the question of the attributes which occupy the Jewish and Muslim theologians so much, Bahya, in his work on ethics, "Hovot ha-Levavot," written in Arabic under the title of "Kitab al-Hidayat fi faraidh al Kulub" (The Duties of the Heart), is of the same opinion as the Motazilites, that the attributes by which one attempts to describe God should be taken in a negative sense, as excluding the opposite attributes. With reference to Gabirol, a positive opinion can not be given on this point, as his "Fons Vitæ" does not deal with the question; but there is reason to believe that he felt the influence of the Asharites, who admitted attributes. In fact, in his poetical philosophy, entitled "Keter Malkut" (The Crown of Royalty), Gabirol uses numerous attributes in describing God. By way of a general statement, one may say that the Neoplatonic philosophy among the Jews of the eleventh century marks a transitional epoch, leading either to the pure philosophy of the Peripatetics or to the mysticism of the Kabbalah.

== The apotheosis of philosophy ==
In the twelfth century, pure philosophy peaked while the Kalam declined, ultimately fading due to attacks from philosophers and orthodox theologians. This rise in philosophy was largely influenced by Al-Ghazali (c. 1058–1111) among the Arabs and Judah Halevi (1140) among the Jews. In fact, the attacks directed against the philosophers by Gazzali in his work, "TuḦfat al-Falasafa" (The Destruction of the Philosophers), not only produced, by reaction, a current favorable to philosophy but induced the philosophers themselves to profit from his criticism, they thereafter making their theories clearer and their logic closer. The influence of this reaction brought forth the two greatest philosophers that the Arabic Peripatetic school ever produced, namely, Ibn Baja (Avempace) and Ibn Roshd (Averroes), both of whom undertook the defense of philosophy.

Gazzali found an imitator in the person of Judah ha-Levi. This illustrious poet took it upon himself to free religion from the shackles of speculative philosophy and, to this end, wrote the "Cuzari", in which he sought to discredit all schools of philosophy alike. He passes severe censure upon the Motekallamin for seeking to support religion by philosophy. He says, "I consider him to have attained the highest degree of perfection who is convinced of religious truths without having scrutinized them and reasoned over them" ("Cuzari," v.). Then he reduced the chief propositions of the Motekallamin, to prove the unity of God, to ten in number, describing them at length and concluding in these terms: "Does the Kalam give us more information concerning God and His attributes than the prophet did?" (Ib. iii. and iv.) Aristotelianism finds no favor in his eyes, for it is no less given to details and criticism; Neoplatonism alone suited him somewhat, owing to its appeal to his poetic temperament.

The Jewish Gazzali was not more successful than his Arabian counterpart. While his critiques contributed to the decline of the Kalam, which lost its relevance, they were ineffective against Peripatetic philosophy, subsequently gaining many defenders. In fact, soon after the "Cuzari" made its appearance, Abraham ibn Daud published his "Emunah Ramah" (The Sublime Faith), wherein he recapitulated the teachings of the Peripatetics, Al-Farabi, and Ibn Sina, upon the physics and metaphysics of Aristotle, and sought to demonstrate that these theories were in perfect harmony with the doctrines of Judaism. "It is an error generally current," says Ibn Daud in the preface of his book, "that the study of speculative philosophy is dangerous to religion. True philosophy not only does not harm religion, it confirms and strengthens it."

=== Maimonides with Aristotle against the MoteKallamin ===
However, Ibn Daud's authority did not suffice to give permanence to Aristotelianism in Judaism. This accomplishment was reserved for Maimonides, who discussed the relevance of the philosophy of Aristotle to Judaism; and to this end he composed his immortal work, "Dalalat al-Ḥairin" (Guide for the Perplexed) —known better under its Hebrew title "Moreh Nevuchim"—which served for many centuries as the subject of discussion and comment by Jewish thinkers.

In this work, Maimonides, after refuting the propositions of the Motekallamin, considers Creation, the Unity of God, the Attributes of God, the Soul, etc., and treats them in accordance with the theories of Aristotle to the extent in which these latter do not conflict with religion. For example, while accepting the teachings of Aristotle upon matter and form, he pronounces against the eternity of matter.

=== Maimonides against Aristotle ===
In addition to pronouncing against the eternity of matter, he neither accepts Aristotle's theory that God can have a knowledge of universals only, and not of particulars. If He had no knowledge of particulars, He would be subject to constant change. Maimonides argues: "God perceives future events before they happen, and this perception never fails Him. Therefore there are no new ideas to present themselves to Him. He knows that such and such an individual does not yet exist but that he will be born at such a time, exist for such a period, and then return into non-existence. When then this individual comes into being, God does not learn any new fact; nothing has happened that He knew not of, for He knew this individual, such as he is now, before his birth" ("Moreh," i. 20). While seeking thus to avoid the troublesome consequences certain Aristotelian theories would entail upon religion, Maimonides could not altogether escape those involved in Aristotle's idea of the unity of souls; and herein he laid himself open to the attacks of the orthodox.

=== Averroism ===
Ibn Roshd (or Ibn Rushd or Averroes), the contemporary of Maimonides, closes the philosophical era of the Arabs. The boldness of this great commentator of Aristotle aroused the full fury of the orthodox, who, in their zeal, attacked all philosophers indiscriminately and had all philosophical writings committed to the flames. The theories of Ibn Roshd do not differ fundamentally from those of Ibn Bajjah and Ibn Tufail, who only follow the teachings of Ibn Sina and Al-Farabi. Like all Arabic Peripatetics, Ibn Roshd admits the hypothesis of the intelligence of the spheres and the hypothesis of universal emanation, through which motion is communicated from place to place to all parts of the universe as far as the supreme world—hypotheses which, in the mind of the Arabic philosophers, did away with the dualism involved in Aristotle's doctrine of pure energy and eternal matter. But while Al-Farabi, Ibn Sina, and other Arab philosophers hurried, so to speak, over subjects that were trenched on religious dogmas, Ibn Roshd delighted in dwelling upon them with full particularity and stress. Thus, he says, "Not only is matter eternal, but form is potentially inherent in matter; otherwise, it were a creation ex nihilo (Munk, "Mélanges," p. 444). According to this theory, therefore, the existence of this world is not only a possibility, as Ibn Sina declared—in order to make concessions to the orthodox—but also a necessity. Driven from the Arabian schools, Arabic philosophy found a refuge with the Jews, to whom belongs the honor of having transmitted it to the Christian world. A series of eminent men—such as the Tibbons, Narboni, Gersonides—joined in translating the Arabic philosophical works into Hebrew and commenting upon them. The works of Ibn Roshd especially became the subject of their study, due in great measure to Maimonides, who, in a letter addressed to his pupil Joseph ben Judah, spoke in the highest terms of Ibn Roshd's commentary.

== Influence of Andalusi mystical theosophy ==
Vahid Brown states that the cross-fertilization among Jewish and Islamic philosophical mysticism, including Kabbalah and Sufism, in Al-Andalus, Spain during its Golden Age, apart from its impact on European Renaissance, had a strong influence in later developments in both philosophies in the rest of the Jewish and Muslim world.

== See also ==
- David ibn Merwan al-Mukkamas
- Early Islamic philosophy
- Golden age of Jewish culture in Spain
- Islamic philosophy
- Islamic-Jewish relations
- Jewish philosophy
