= School of Chartres =

11th/12th century centre of French scholarship

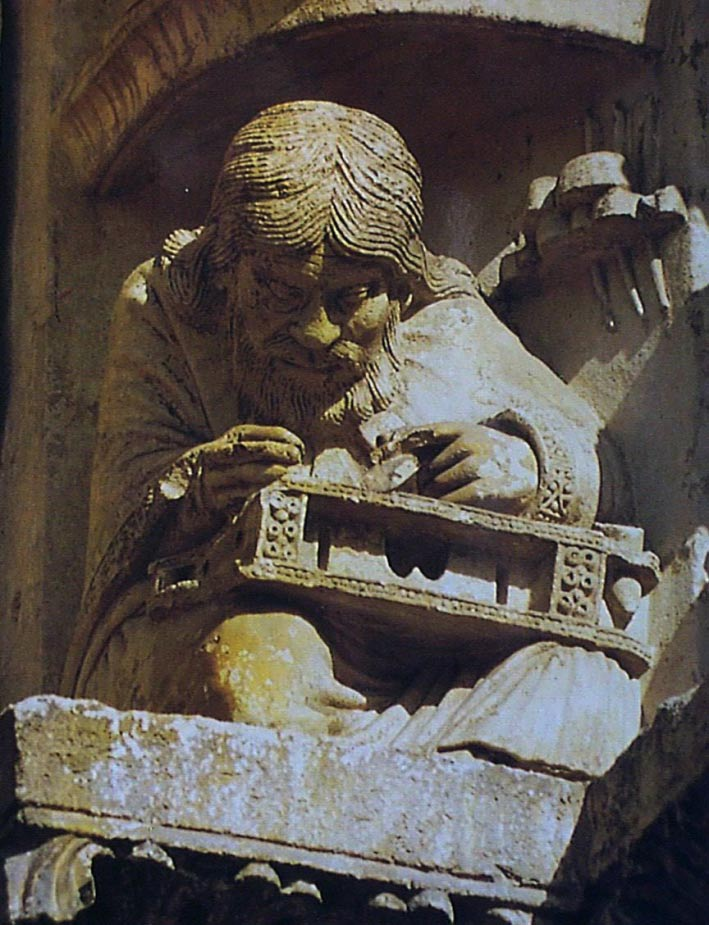
Pythagoras, representing the liberal art of music, on one of the archivolts over the right door of the west portal at the Chartres Cathedral.

During the High Middle Ages, the Chartres Cathedral established the cathedral School of Chartres, an important center of French scholarship located in Chartres. It developed and reached its apex during the transitional period of the 11th and 12th centuries, at the start of the Latin translation movement. This period was also right before the spread of medieval universities, which eventually superseded cathedral schools and monastic schools as the most important institutions of higher learning in the Latin West.

In the early 11th century (c. 1020), Bishop Fulbert established Chartres as one of the leading schools in Europe. Although the role of Fulbert himself as a scholar and teacher has been questioned, his administrative ability established the conditions in which the school could flourish.

Great scholars were attracted to the cathedral school, including Bernard of Chartres, Thierry of Chartres, William of Conches, and the Englishman John of Salisbury. These men were at the forefront of the intense intellectual rethinking that culminated in what is now known as the twelfth-century Renaissance, pioneering the Scholastic philosophy that came to dominate medieval thinking throughout Europe.

As with most monastic and cathedral schools, the school's teaching was based on the traditional seven liberal arts, grouped into the trivium (study of logic, grammar and rhetoric) and into the quadrivium (arithmetic, geometry, music, and astronomy). There were, however, differences among the schools on the emphasis given to each subject. The Chartres school placed special emphasis on the quadrivium (the mathematical arts) and on natural philosophy.

Chartres' greatest period was the first half of the twelfth century, but it eventually could not support the city's large number of students and its masters lacked the relative autonomy developing around the city's other schools. By the later 12th century, the status of the school was on the wane. It was gradually eclipsed by the newly emerging University of Paris, particularly by the School of the Abbey of St. Victor (attended by the 'Victorines').

== Bibliography ==
- Edouard Jeauneau, Rethinking the School of Chartres, Toronto: University of Toronto Press, 2009.
