= John Owen =

John Owen may refer to:

== Sports ==
- John Owen (footballer) (1849–1921), English footballer and educator
- John Owen (athlete) (1861–1924), American sprinter
- Johnny Owen (1956–1980), Welsh boxer
- John Owen (cricketer) (born 1971), English cricketer
- John Owen (rugby union), English international rugby union player

== Religious figures ==
- John Owen (bishop of St Asaph) (1580–1651), Bishop of St Asaph, Wales
- John Owen (theologian) (1616–1683), English Nonconformist church leader, theologian, and Vice-Chancellor of the University of Oxford
- John Owen (dean of Clonmacnoise) (1686–1760), Irish Anglican priest
- John Owen (chancellor of Bangor) (1698–1755), Welsh priest and opponent of Methodism
- John Owen (archdeacon of Richmond) (1754–1824), archdeacon of Richmond and chaplain general of the British Armed Forces
- John Owen (1766–1822), English Anglican cleric and secretary of the British and Foreign Bible Society
- John Owen (chess player) (1827–1901), English vicar and amateur chess player
- John Owen (bishop of St Davids) (1854–1926), bishop of St Davids, principal of St David's College, Lampeter

== Politicians ==
- John Owen (theologian) (1616–1683), English religious leader and MP for Oxford University
- John Owen (MP for Caernarvon Boroughs), see Caernarvon Boroughs
- John Lewis Owen, MP for Merioneth
- John Owen (MP for Anglesey and Beaumaris) (died 1754), Welsh politician, represented Anglesey and Beaumaris in Parliament
- Sir John Owen, 1st Baronet (1776–1861), Member of Parliament for Pembroke, 1841–1861
- John Owen (North Carolina politician) (1787–1841), Democratic governor of North Carolina from 1828 to 1830
- John J. Owen (1859–1933), member of the Virginia Senate

== Others ==
- John Dyfnallt Owen (1873–1956), poet and Archdruid
- John Glendwr Owen (1914–1977), British civil servant
- John H. Owen (1922–2011), president of the University of North Georgia and U.S. Navy officer
- John Joseph Thomas Owen (1934—2023), British immunologist
- John Owen (author) (1952–2001), dramatist and director
- John Owen (epigrammatist) (c. 1564–1622), Welsh epigrammatist
- John Owen (judge), British barrister, High Court judge, and ecclesiastical judge
- John Owen (Owain Alaw) (1821–1883), Welsh musician and composer
- John Owen (Royal Marines officer) (1777–1857)
- Sir John Owen (1600–1666), Welsh Royalist officer during the English Civil War
- John Simpson Owen (1912–95), Ugandan-born British conservationist
- John Owen (Formula One), British Formula One engineer
- John Owen (centenarian) (1735–1843), American centenarian
- SS John Owen, a Liberty ship

== See also ==
- Johnny Owen (Nebraska politician) (1907–1978), member of the Nebraska House of Representatives
- John Owen-Jones (born 1971), Welsh theatre actor
- Jon Owen, American luger
- Jon Owen Jones (born 1954), Welsh politician
- Jonny Owen (born 1971), Welsh actor
- Jack Owen (disambiguation)
- John Owens (disambiguation)
