= Hen Wlad Fy Nhadau =

National anthem of Wales

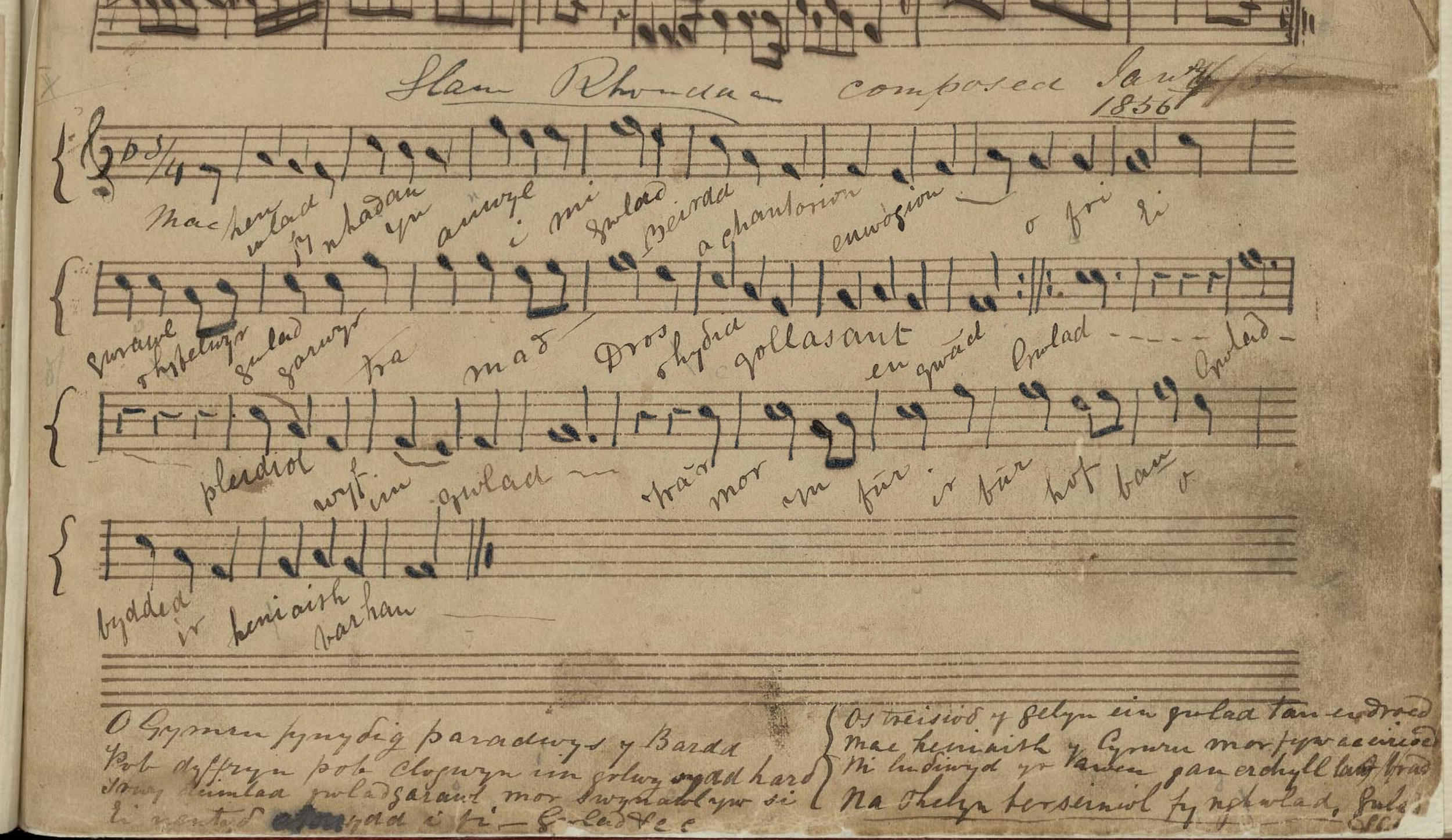
- The earliest version of a musical notation of Hen Wlad Fy Nhadau written in the hand of the composer James James in 1856
- Traditional anthem of Wales
- Lyrics: Evan James, 1856
- Music: James James, 1856

Audio sample
- Piano sound version: file; help

"Hen Wlad Fy Nhadau" (Welsh pronunciation: [heːn wlaːd və n̥adai̯]) is the de facto national anthem of Wales. The title, taken from the first words of the song, means "The Old Land of My Fathers" in Welsh, usually rendered in English as simply "Land of My Fathers". The words were written by Evan James and the tune composed by his son, James James, both residents of Pontypridd, Glamorgan, in January 1856. The earliest written copy survives and is part of the collections of the National Library of Wales.

It was first used as Wales' national anthem in 1905 by fans at a rugby game, and it then became the sole anthem used for Wales in sports from 1975. It has been used at government ceremonies, and for receptions of the British monarchy since the 1970s. The anthem, like the other ones in the UK, lack official status in law, with petitions submitted proposing it is made official by law. It is however widely recognised as Wales' national anthem, despite having no official status.

== History ==
=== Origins ===
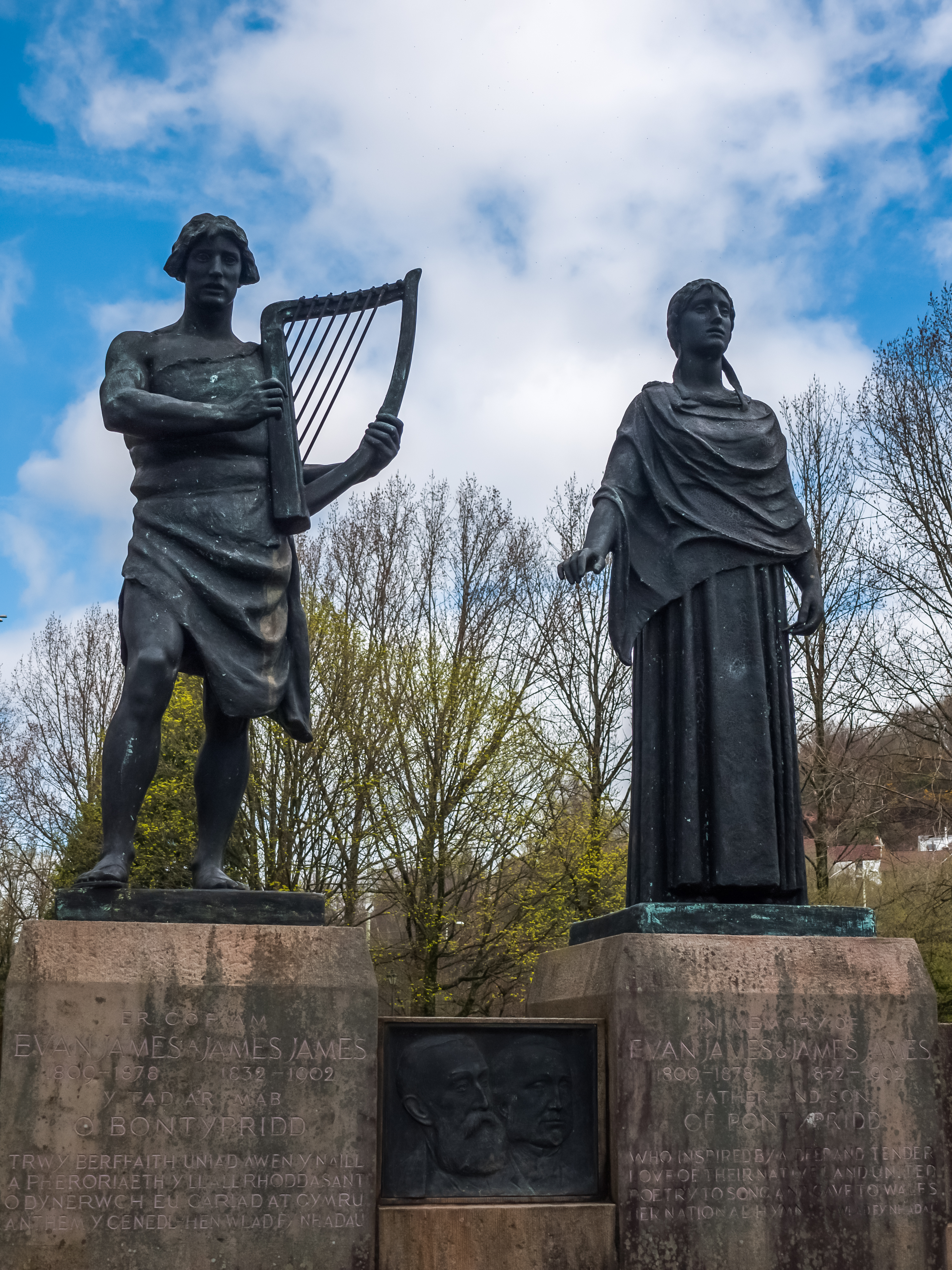
The composers of Hen Wlad Fy Nhadau, Evan James and James James depicted in a memorial at Ynysangharad War Memorial Park, Pontypridd, Wales

"Glan Rhondda" ("Banks of the Rhondda"), as it was known when it was composed, was first performed in the vestry of the original Capel Tabor, Maesteg (which later became a working men's club), in either January or February 1856, by Elizabeth John from Pontypridd, and it soon became popular in the locality.

James James, the composer, was a harpist who played his instrument in the public house which he ran, for the purpose of dancing. The song was originally intended to be performed in 6/8 time but had to be slowed down to its present 3/4 tempo when it began to be sung by large crowds.

=== Popularity ===
The popularity of the song increased after the Llangollen Eisteddfod of 1858. Thomas Llewelyn of Aberdare won a competition for an unpublished collection of Welsh airs with a collection that included "Glan Rhondda". The adjudicator of the competition, "Owain Alaw" (John Owen, 1821–1883) asked for permission to include "Glan Rhondda" in his publication, Gems of Welsh melody (1860–1864). This volume gave "Glan Rhondda" its more famous title, "Hen Wlad Fy Nhadau", and was sold in large quantities and ensured the popularity of the anthem across the whole of Wales.

At the Bangor Eisteddfod of 1874 "Hen Wlad Fy Nhadau" gained further popularity when it was sung by Robert Rees ("Eos Morlais"), one of the leading Welsh soloists of his day. It was increasingly sung at patriotic gatherings and gradually it developed into a national anthem.

1899 piano and female vocal recording (first verse and chorus)
First recording of the anthem, sung by Madge Breese

"Hen Wlad Fy Nhadau" was also one of the first Welsh-language songs recorded, when Madge Breese sang it on 11 March 1899, for the Gramophone Company, as part of the first recording in the Welsh language.

"Hen Wlad Fy Nhadau" was the first national anthem to be sung at the start of a sporting event. In 1905, the Welsh national rugby team hosted New Zealand's first touring team, who started every match performing a haka. As a response, Wales player Teddy Morgan led the crowd singing the anthem. Although crowds often sang anthems during games, there was no precedent for an anthem to be sung before a match. (Note: In the United States, singing of patriotic songs before games was first observed in the years following the Civil War, with "The Star-Spangled Banner" occasionally being sung before baseball games. However, the song's pregame use did not become customary until the 1920s, and "The Star-Spangled Banner" did not become the official national anthem until 1931.)

In 1978 for their Hen Wlad Fy Nhadau album, Geraint Jarman a'r Cynganeddwyr recorded a version of the anthem using electric guitars, inspired by Jimi Hendrix's rendition of "The Star-Spangled Banner" (as famously performed during the Woodstock festival in 1969 and featured in the documentary of that festival released in 1970). Jarman's version, played by Welsh guitarist Tich Gwilym, is one of the most famous modern versions of the song.

== Usage ==
Tradition has established "Hen Wlad Fy Nhadau" as a de facto Welsh national anthem since 1905, when it was first sung by fans at rugby games, although the official anthem at the time was "God Save the King". "Hen Wlad Fy Nhadau" slowly established itself as the more popular anthem over the next four decades and was sung along with "God Bless the Prince of Wales" and "God Save the Queen" before sporting events until 1975, when sports officials decided that "Hen Wlad Fy Nhadau" should be sung alone. Like other British anthems, it has not been established as a national anthem by law, but it has been used as a national anthem at official governmental ceremonies, including the opening of the Welsh Parliament (Senedd Cymru), and at receptions of the British monarchy since the 1970s. Petitions to make the song an official national anthem for Wales are occasionally submitted to the Senedd, but the last time one raised sufficient signatures to be debated, in 2014, the conclusion was that this is 'not currently a possible development'. It is recognised and used as an anthem at both national and local events in Wales, even despite its lacks official status.

"Imagine some 40,000 people singing their national anthem with all the fervour of which the Celtic heart is capable. It was the most impressive incident I have ever witnessed on a football field. It gave a semi-religious solemnity to this memorable contest, intensely thrilling, even awe-inspiring. It was a wonderful revelation of the serious spirit in which the Welsh take their football."

— All Black captain Dave Gallaher's remark on experiencing the Welsh singing their anthem for the first time.

"Hen Wlad Fy Nhadau" is often considered a must-see or must-hear experience, especially in sporting events in Cardiff such as a rugby match in the Principality Stadium.

Usually, "Hen Wlad Fy Nhadau" will be the only anthem sung: only the first stanza and chorus are usually sung (and in the Welsh language). "God Save the King", the national anthem of the United Kingdom, is sometimes played alongside "Hen Wlad Fy Nhadau" during official events with a royal connection.

The existence of a separate national anthem for Wales has not always been apparent to those from outside the country. In 1993, the newly appointed Secretary of State for Wales, John Redwood, was embarrassingly videotaped opening and closing his mouth during a communal singing of the national anthem, clearly ignorant of the words but unable to mime convincingly; the pictures were frequently cited as evidence of his unsuitability for the post. According to John Major's autobiography, the first thing Redwood's successor William Hague said, on being appointed, was that he had better find someone to teach him the words. He found Ffion Jenkins, and later married her.

"Hen Wlad Fy Nhadau" has been adapted to the anthems of Cornwall ("Bro Goth agan Tasow"), Brittany ("Bro Gozh ma Zadoù"), and Y Wladfa ("Gwlad Newydd y Cymry", see below). These adaptations share the same tune as "Hen Wlad Fy Nhadau" and have similar lyrics.

== Lyrics ==
Welsh original

I
Mae hen wlad fy nhadau yn annwyl i mi,
Gwlad beirdd a chantorion, enwogion o fri;
Ei gwrol ryfelwyr, gwladgarwyr tra mad,
Tros ryddid gollasant eu gwaed. (Note: Often written Dros ryddid collasant eu gwaed.)

Cytgan:
Gwlad! Gwlad! Pleidiol wyf i'm gwlad.
Tra môr yn fur i'r bur hoff bau,
O bydded i'r hen iaith barhau. (Note: Hen iaith ("old language") is sometimes written heniaith.)

II
Hen Gymru fynyddig, paradwys y bardd,
Pob dyffryn, pob clogwyn, i'm golwg sydd hardd;
Trwy deimlad gwladgarol, mor swynol yw si
Ei nentydd, afonydd, i fi. (Note: Fi ("me") is often written mi, the formal and northern colloquial form.)

Cytgan

III
Os treisiodd y gelyn fy ngwlad tan ei droed, (Note: Tan ("under" or "until") is sometimes written dan, the modern word for "under", with tan retained for the meaning "until".)
Mae hen iaith y Cymry mor fyw ag erioed,
Ni luddiwyd yr awen gan erchyll law brad,
Na thelyn berseiniol fy ngwlad.

𝄆 Cytgan 𝄇

IPA transcription (Note: See Help:IPA/Welsh and Welsh phonology. The transliteration is based on the North Welsh pronunciation. South Welsh differs in fronting [ɨ] to [i], among other differences.)

1
/maːɨ̯ heːn wlaːd və ˈn̥a.daɨ̯ ən ˈa.nʊi̯l iː miː/
/ɡwlaːd bɛi̯rð aː χanˈtɔr.jɔn ɛnˈwɔɡ.jɔn oː vriː/
/ɛi̯ ˈɡʊ.rɔl rəˈvɛl.wɪr ɡwladˈɡar.wɪr traː maːd/
/trɔs ˈrə.ðɪd ɡɔˈɬa.sant ɛi̯ ɡwaːɨ̯d/

/ˈkət.ɡan/:
/ɡwlaːd ɡwlaːd ˈplɛi̯d.jɔl uːɨ̯v iːm ɡwlaːd/
/traː moːr ən vɨːr iːr bɨːr hoːf baɨ̯/
/oː ˈbə.ðɛd iːr heːn jai̯θ barˈhaɨ̯/

2
/heːn ˈɡəm.rɨ̞ vəˈnə.ðɪɡ paˈra.dʊɨ̯s ə barð/
/poːb ˈdə.frɨ̞n poːb ˈklɔɡ.wɪn iːm ˈɡɔ.lʊɡ sɨːð harð/
/truːɨ̯ ˈdɛi̯m.lad ɡwladˈɡa.rɔl mɔr ˈsʊɨ̯.nɔl ɪu̯ siː/
/ɛi̯ ˈnɛn.tɨ̞ð aˈvɔ.nɨ̞ð iː viː/

/ˈkət.ɡan/

3
/ɔs ˈtrɛi̯.ʃɔð ə ˈɡɛ.lɨ̞n və ŋwlaːd tan ɛi̯ droːɨ̯d/
/maːɨ̯ heːn jai̯θ ə ˈkəm.rɨ̞ mɔr vɪu̯ aɡ ɛrˈjoːɨ̯d/
/niː ˈlɨ.dɪu̯.ɨ̞d ər ˈau̯.ɛn ɡan ˈɛr.χɨ̞ɬ laːu̯ braːd/
/naː ˈθɛ.lɨn bɛrˈsɛi̯n.jɔl və ŋwlaːd/

𝄆 /ˈkət.ɡan/ 𝄇

English verse translation by A.P. Graves

I
O Land of my fathers, O land of my love,
Dear mother of minstrels who kindle and move,
And hero on hero, who at honour's proud call,
For freedom their lifeblood let fall.

Chorus:
Country! Country! O but my heart is with you!
As long as the sea your bulwark shall be,
To Cymru my heart shall be true.

II
O land of the mountains, the bard's paradise,
Whose precipice, valleys are fair to my eyes,
Green murmuring forest, far echoing flood
Fire the fancy and quicken the blood

Chorus

III
For tho' the fierce foeman has ravaged your realm,
The old speech of Wales he cannot o'erwhelm,
Our passionate poets to silence command,
Or banish the harp from your strand.

𝄆 Chorus 𝄇

English verse translation by W.S. Gwynn Williams

I
The land of my fathers is dear unto me,
Old land where the minstrels are honoured and free;
Its warring defenders so gallant and brave,
For freedom their life's blood they gave.

Chorus:
Home, home, true I am to home,
While seas secure the land so pure,
O may the old language endure.

II
Old land of the mountains, the Eden of bards,
Each gorge and each valley a loveliness guards;
Through love of my country, charmed voices will be
Its streams, and its rivers, to me.

Chorus

III
Though foemen have trampled my land 'neath their feet,
The language of Cambria still knows no retreat;
The muse is not vanquished by traitor's fell hand,
Nor silenced the harp of my land.

𝄆 Chorus 𝄇

English verse translation by Owain Alaw

I
Оh! Land of my fathers, the land of the free,
The home of the Telyn, so soothing to me;
Thy noble defenders were gallant and brave,
For thy freedom their hearts' life they gave!

Chorus:
Wales, Wales, my mother's sweet home is in Wales,
Till death be pass'd my love shall last,
My longing, my hiraeth for Wales.

II
Thou Eden of bards, and birthplace of song,
The sons of thy mountains are valiant and strong;
The voice of thy streamlets is soft to the ear,
Thy hills and thy vallies how dear!

Chorus

III
Though trampled and crush'd by oppression's foul wrong,
The language of Cambria still lives on in song;
The Awen survives, nor have envious tales
Yet silenced the harp of dear Wales.

𝄆 Chorus 𝄇

A more literal English translation

I
The old land of my fathers is dear to me,
Land of bards and singers, famous men of renown;
Her brave warriors, very splendid patriots,
For freedom shed their blood.

Chorus:
Country, Country, I am faithful to my Country.
While the sea [is] a wall to the pure, most loved land,
O may the old language [sc. Welsh] endure.

II
Old mountainous Wales, paradise of the bard,
Every valley, every cliff, to my look is beautiful.
Through patriotic feeling, so charming is the murmur
Of her brooks, rivers, to me.

Chorus

III
If the enemy oppresses my land under his foot,
The old language of the Welsh is as alive as ever.
The muse is not hindered by the hideous hand of treason,
Nor the melodious harp of my country.

𝄆 Chorus 𝄇

== Cultural influence ==
The Royal Badge of Wales

The Welsh poet Dylan Thomas is often quoted as saying "The land of my fathers. My fathers can have it!" in reference to Wales. However, this is misleading, as it was a villainous character in one of Thomas' short stories that spoke this line.

Gwynfor Evans named his history of Wales Land of my fathers: 2,000 years of Welsh history. It was a translation of the Welsh original, Aros Mae.

The £1 coins minted in 1985, 1990, 1995 and 2000 with a Welsh emblem on the reverse, also bear the edge inscription PLEIDIOL WYF I'M GWLAD ("I am devoted to my country"), from the refrain of "Hen Wlad Fy Nhadau". The new Royal Badge of Wales adopted in 2008 features this motto.

== Use in other national anthems ==
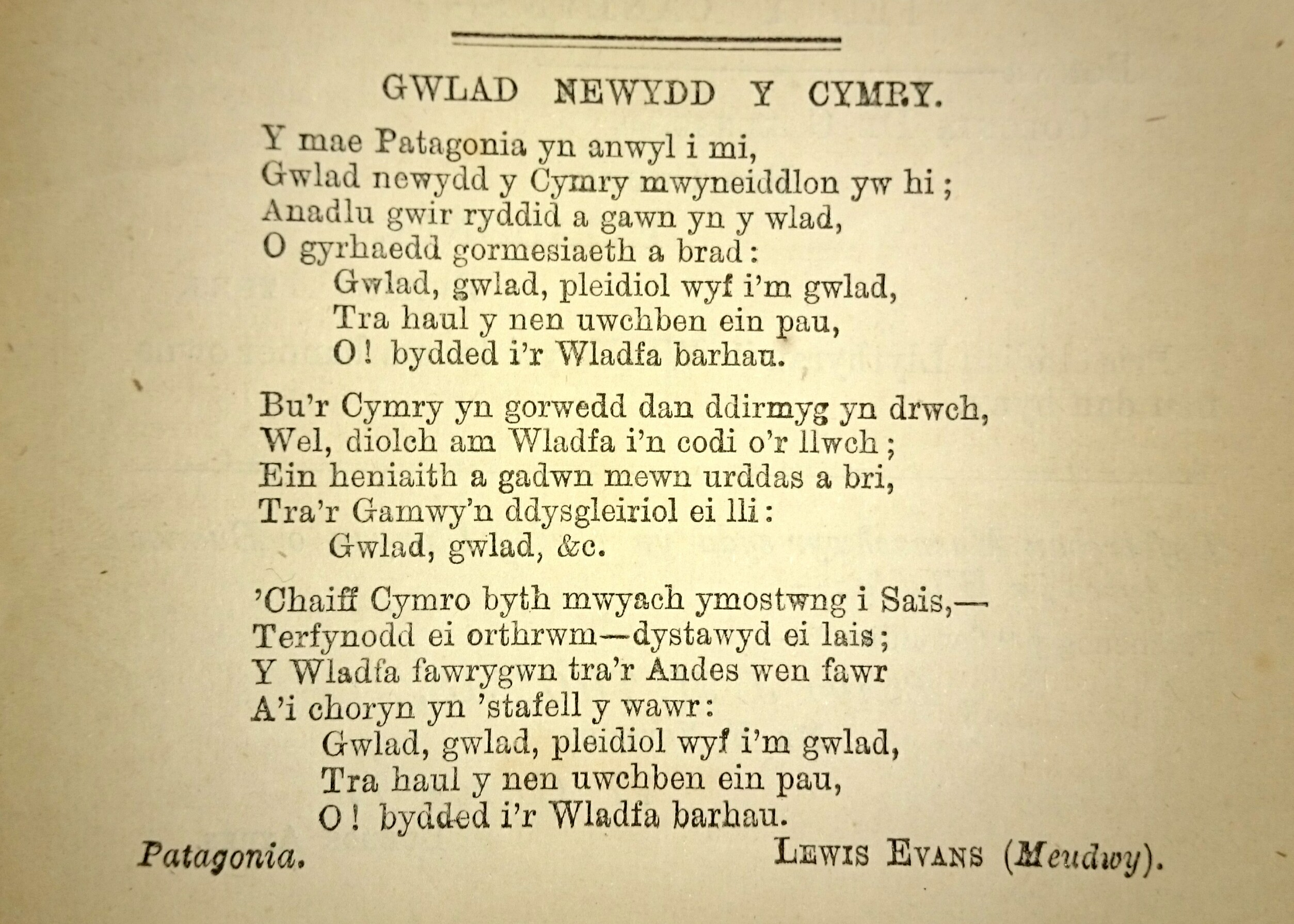
A printed version of Gwlad Newydd y Cymry, an adaption of Hen Wlad Fy Nhadau for Y Wladfa, the Welsh area of settlement in Patagonia.

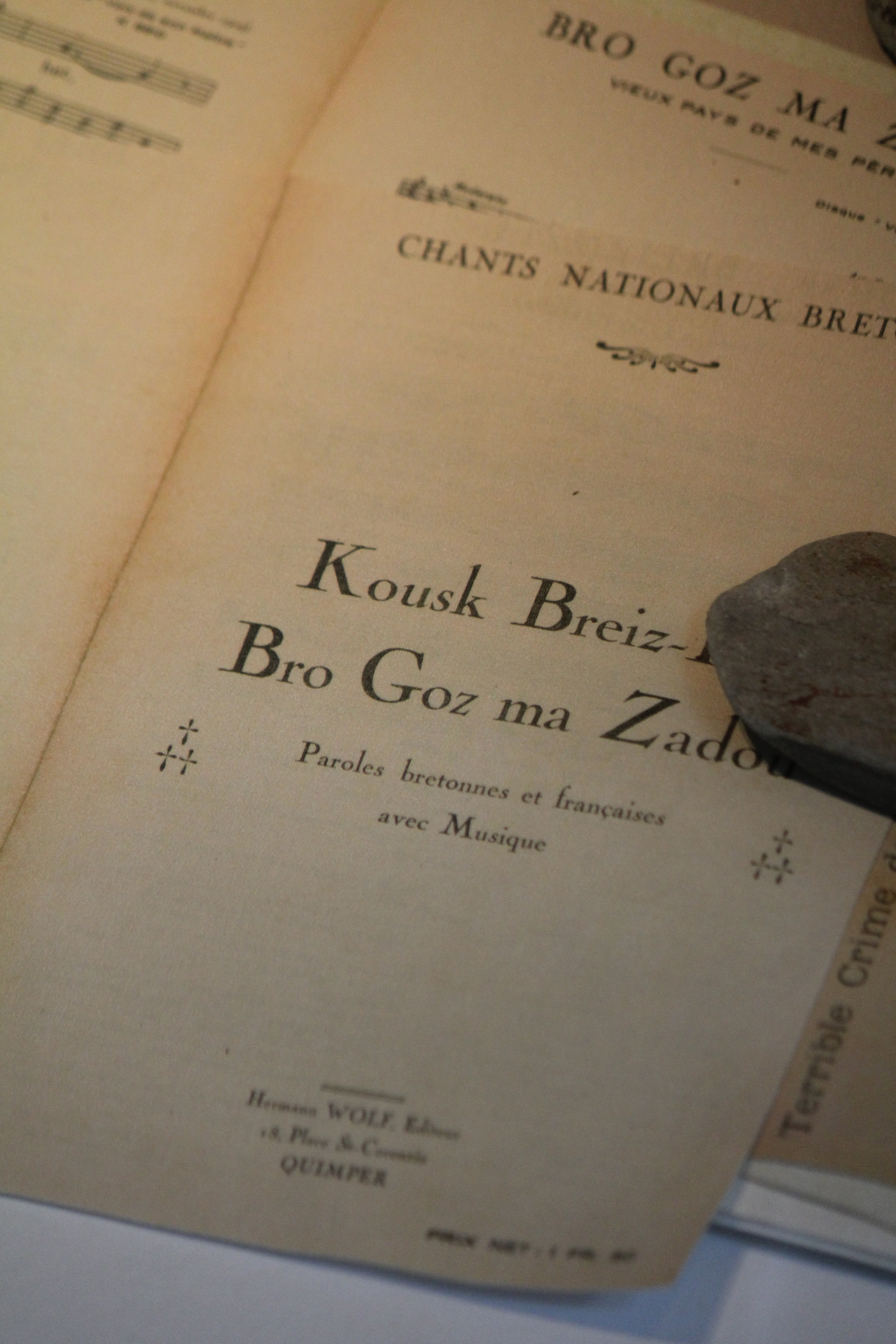
A collection of Breton national songs including "Bro Gozh ma Zadoù" the Breton version of Hen Wlad Fy Nhadau

A version of "Hen Wlad Fy Nhadau" was written by Lewis Evans, a migrant from Wales to Y Wladfa, a Welsh-speaking settlement in Patagonia, South America. The version penned by Evans is called "Gwlad Newydd y Cymry" ("The New Country of the Welsh"). "Gwlad Newydd y Cymry" is played to the same tune as "Hen Wlad Fy Nhadau".

The lyrics to "Gwlad Newydd y Cymry" are as follows (note that the spelling is not consistent with modern Welsh):

Welsh original

I
Y mae Patagonia yn annwyl i mi,
Gwlad newydd y Cymry mwyneiddlon yw hi;
Anadlu gwir ryddid a gawn yn y wlad,
O gyrhaedd gormesiaeth a brad:

Cytgan:
Gwlad, gwlad, pleidiol wyf i'm gwlad,
Tra haul y nen uwchben ein pau,
O! bydded i'r Wladfa barhau.

II
Bu'r Cymry yn gorwedd dan ddirmyg yn drwch,
Wel, diolch am Wladfa i'n codi o'r llwch;
Ein heniaith a gadwn mewn urddas a bri,
Tra'r Gamwy'n ddysgleiriol ei lli:

Cytgan

III
'Chaiff Cymro byth mwyach ymostwng i Sais,-
Terfynodd ei orthrwm - dystawyd ei lais;
Y Wladfa fawrygwn tra'r Andes wen fawr,
A'i choryn yn 'stafell y wawr:

𝄆 Cytgan 𝄇

English translation

I
Patagonia is dear to me,
The new land of the noble Welsh people;
True freedom we breathe in our new country,
Far from the reach of oppression and betrayal:

Chorus:
Nation [or country], Nation, I am faithful to my Nation.
While the sun rises above the land,
Oh! may the Settlement continue.

II
The Welsh have been lying broken in scorn,
Well, thanks to the Wladfa from dust we're reborn;
Our language of old we laud and esteem
While Camwy flows with shining stream:

Chorus

III
Let Welshman submit to the English no more,
Their oppression is ended, and silenced their roar;
Y Wladfa we praise while the great white Andes,
With its peak in the chamber of dawn:

𝄆 Chorus 𝄇

== See also ==
- List of British anthems
- Welsh nationalism
