= Robert Gilliam =

Robert Gilliam may refer to:

- Robert B. Gilliam (1805–1870), American politician and judge
- Robert Gilliam (1951–2005), birth name of Welsh guitarist Tich Gwilym
