= Ynysangharad War Memorial Park =

Public park in Pontypridd, Wales

Coordinates: 51.6025°N 3.3364°W

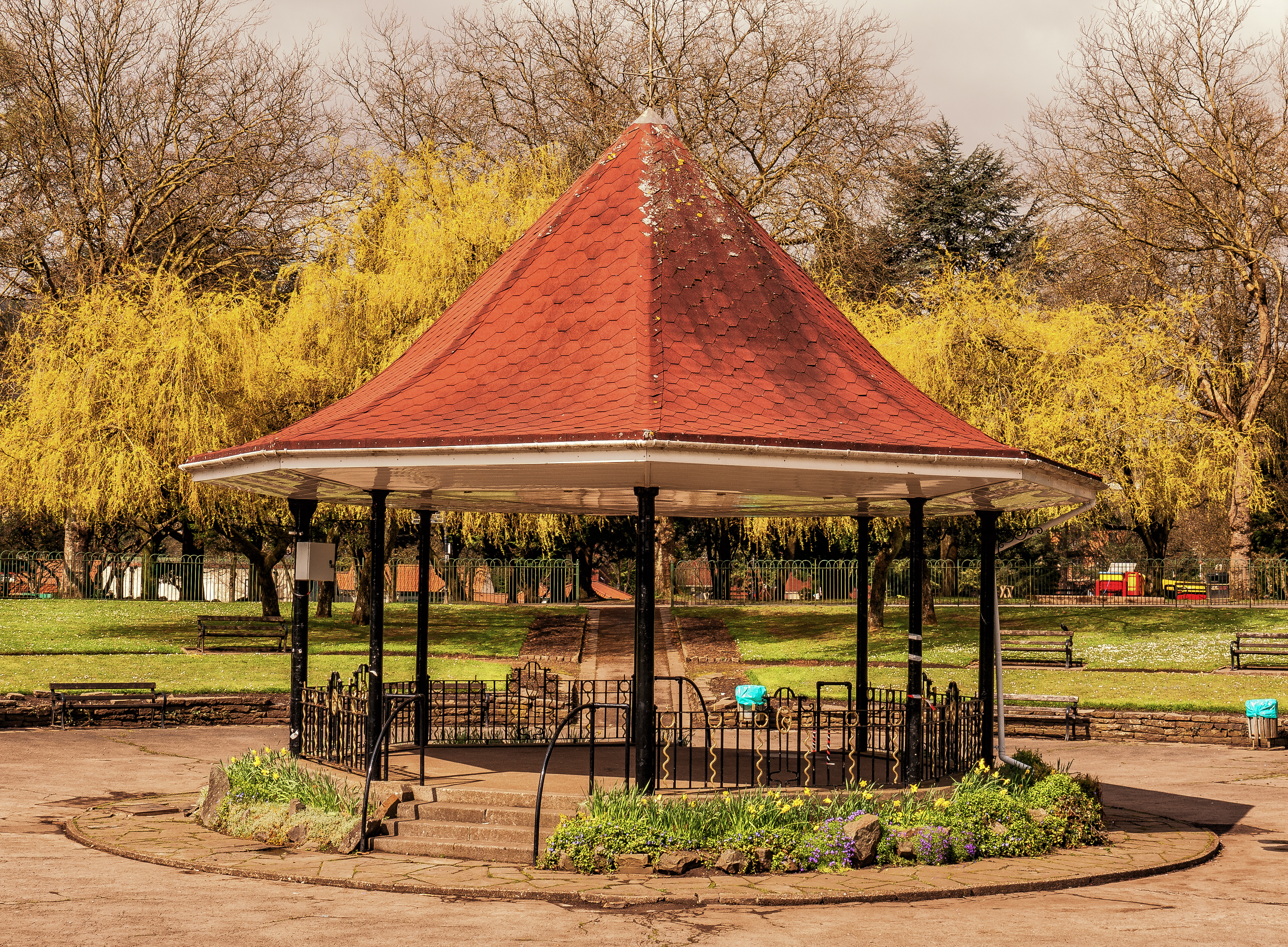
The bandstand in the park

Ynysangharad War Memorial Park is located in the town of Pontypridd, Wales. The area that now makes up the park was bought by the people of Pontypridd in 1919 after workers raised the money to establish the park. It was originally designed for those who lived in the surrounding area to have somewhere to relax from their work lives. The park is designated Grade II on the Cadw/ICOMOS Register of Parks and Gardens of Special Historic Interest in Wales.

As the River Rhondda meets the River Taff at one corner of the park, it is prone to flooding; a 1929 flood left the park severely flooded and led to the original layout of the park being changed to what it is today with the memorials being placed way from the River Taff. The memorials in the park include the War Memorial and the Evan and James James statues, as well as some smaller ones. A cricket ground, Ynysangharad Park, is located within the park. There is also a lido that was reopened on 31 August 2015 after it received funding, after being closed for two decades.

== War memorial ==
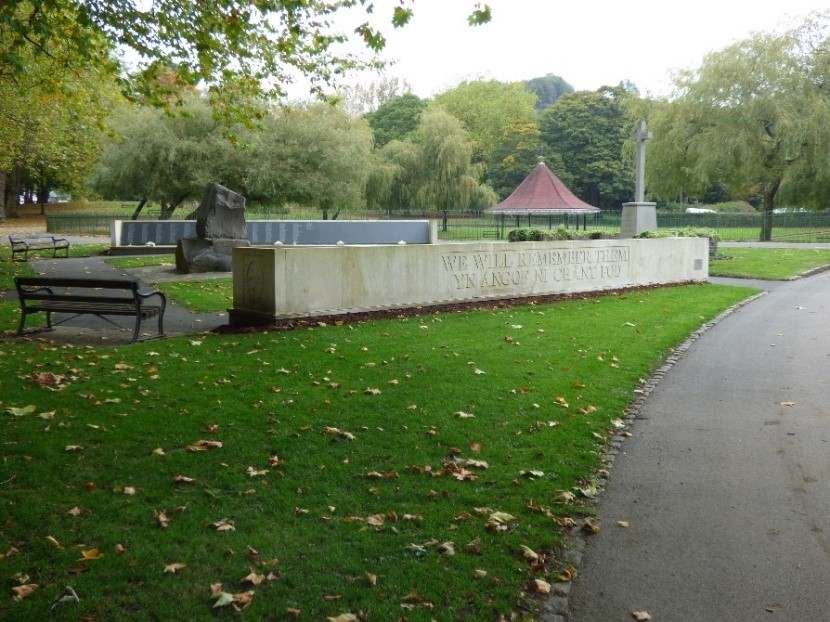
The war memorials

In 1923 Field Marshal Viscount Allenby renamed the park the Ynysangharad War Memorial park in memory of the soldiers who died in the line of duty in the First World War. In November 2011 a war memorial was reopened in the park to remember the soldiers who died from the Pontypridd area in the First World War and Second World War, as well as subsequent smaller wars like the Suez Crisis and the Falklands War. There was already a small memorial in the park to remember the soldiers who died, but it was decided that a roll of honour should also be erected so that the names of the dead would not be forgotten. The memorial consists of two parallel walls with the names of the dead inscribed onto black granite plaques that run along each wall. There are 1,319 names on the memorial, which includes the names of 821 people who died in the First World War, and 491 who died in the Second World War. The memorial also includes the names of servicemen who died in the line of duty in Palestine, Korea and Suez Canal (Egypt) wars, and the four Welsh Guards who died during the Falklands War. The memorial cost an estimated £80,000 to build and was completed thanks to fundraising appeals by local residents of Pontypridd.

The park is designated Grade II on the Cadw/ICOMOS Register of Parks and Gardens of Special Historic Interest in Wales.

== Evan James and James James memorial ==
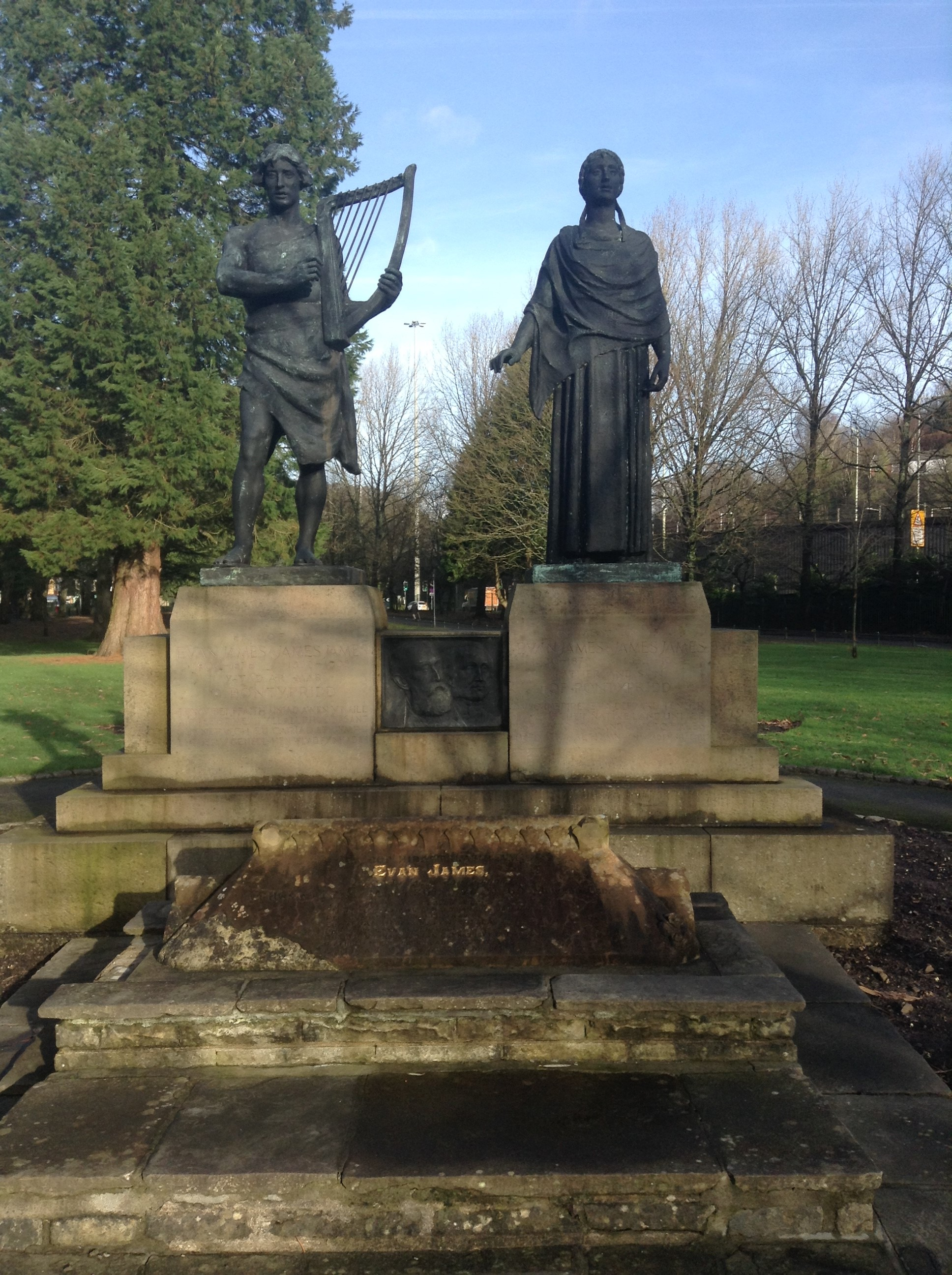
The figures represent poetry and music

In the park there is a memorial to Evan James and his son James James who wrote Hen Wlad Fy Nhadau, the Welsh National Anthem. Evan James and his son James were weavers who lived in Pontypridd when they composed the National Anthem in 1856; James wrote the words while Evan composed the music. Although originally called Glan Rhondda (Banks of the Rhondda) it was quickly renamed Hen Wlad Fy Nhadau (Land of My Fathers) when it gained huge popularity after being performed at the 1858 Llangollen National Eisteddfod. Unlike many anthems it was not written to represent a particular occasion in history, but by 1905 was largely accepted as the National Anthem by the Welsh population simply because of how popular it had become. This means that even though Hen Wlad Fy Nhadau is accepted as the Welsh National Anthem, it is neither officially or legally recognised as it in British Law, since legally the National Anthem of Wales is God Bless the Prince of Wales. Following James James' death in 1902 many local residents felt that a memorial should be erected to both Evan and James James to remember the authors of the National Anthem and started a campaign to have one built. However the Senghenydd colliery disaster in 1913 and the outbreak of the First World War in 1914 stopped the campaign. Then in 1929 Rhys Morgan put an advert in the Western Mail appealing for money to have a memorial built, stating that he expected a "prompt response" from every "Welsh man or woman"; the money was quickly raised. The memorial was designed by Sir William Goscombe John and unveiled by Lord Treowen on 23 July 1930 before a crowd of 10,000 people. The monument consists of two life size bronze figures, one woman who represents poetry and a male harpist who represents music. There is an inscription under the memorial that reads:

In memory of Evan James and James James, father and son of Pontypridd, who inspired by a deep and tender love of their native land united poetry to song and gave Wales her National Anthem, Hen Wlad fy Nhdau.

== Pontypridd Outdoor Lido ==
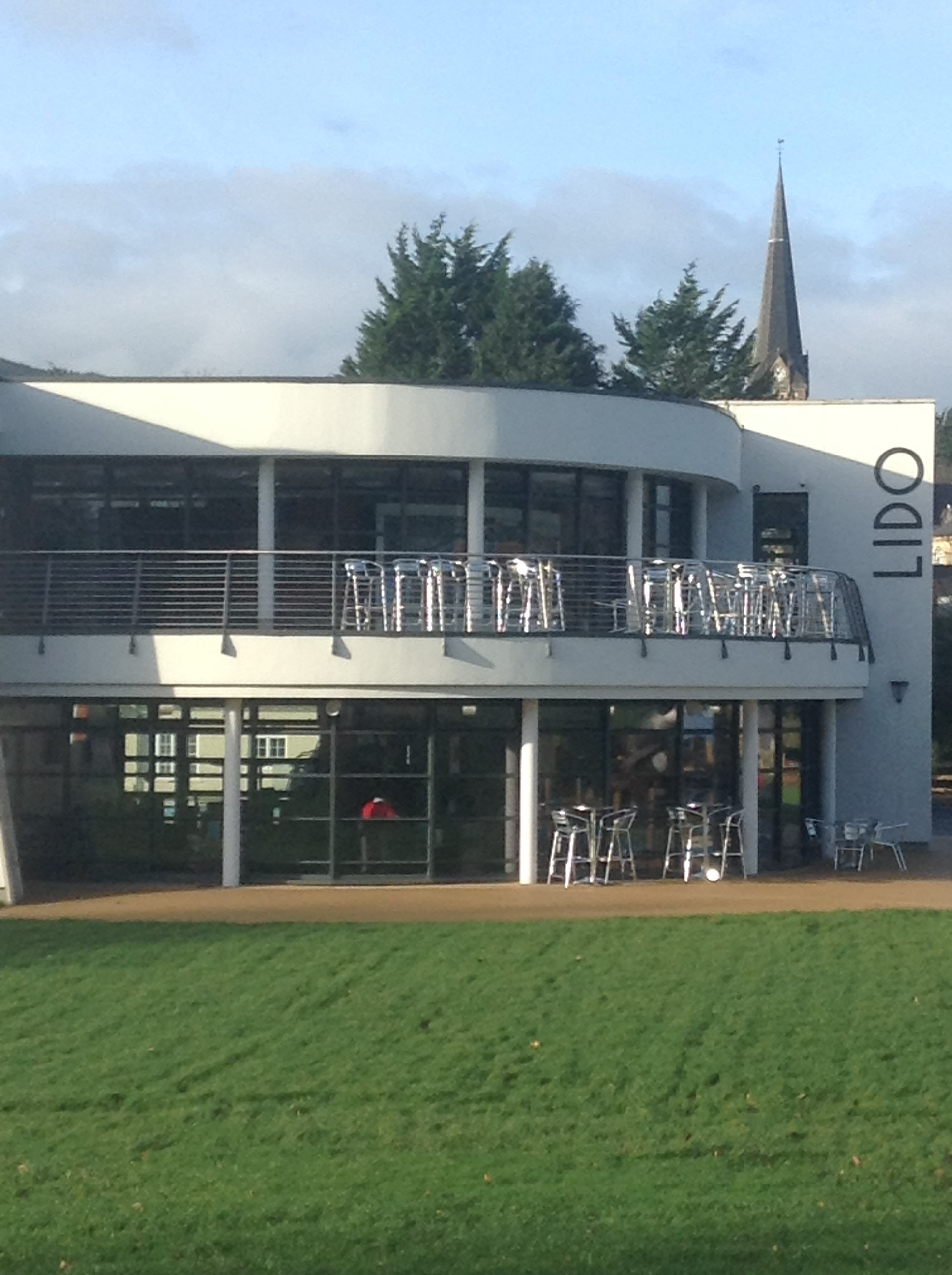
The Grade II listed lido

The lido was opened in 1927 and was reputed to be the largest open–air swimming pool in Wales and at its most popular the lido could have up to 1,000 visitors a day. The lido was built with a distinctive Mediterranean influence, like many other lidos around Britain, and features outdoor changing rooms that ran parallel to the edge of the lido. After years of not being maintained the lido was officially closed in 1991 after it was badly damaged by a fire. Over the next two decades, it fell into disrepair but could not be demolished because it is a Grade II Listed Building. In 2013, following a £6.3m investment from the Welsh Government, using the European Regional Development Fund and Heritage Lottery Funding, plans for the lido to be refurbished and reopened were started. Many of the original features of the Grade II Listed Building, like the turnstile and the outdoor wooden changing rooms, were kept. New features were added, including a café, visitors centre, an observation deck, and heated changing facilities with internal and external showers for those who use the lido. While the old lido only had one large pool, the updated lido now includes a main pool alongside an activities pool and a splash pool for small children. The lido was officially reopened on 31 August 2015.

== 2024 National Eisteddfod ==
The 2024 National Eisteddfod of Wales took place in Pontypridd in August 2024, with Ynysangharad Park becoming the main location for the event, its Maes and pavilions.

== See also ==
- The Big Welsh Bite Food Festival
