= James James =

Welsh musician, composer of the Welsh national anthem (1832–1902)

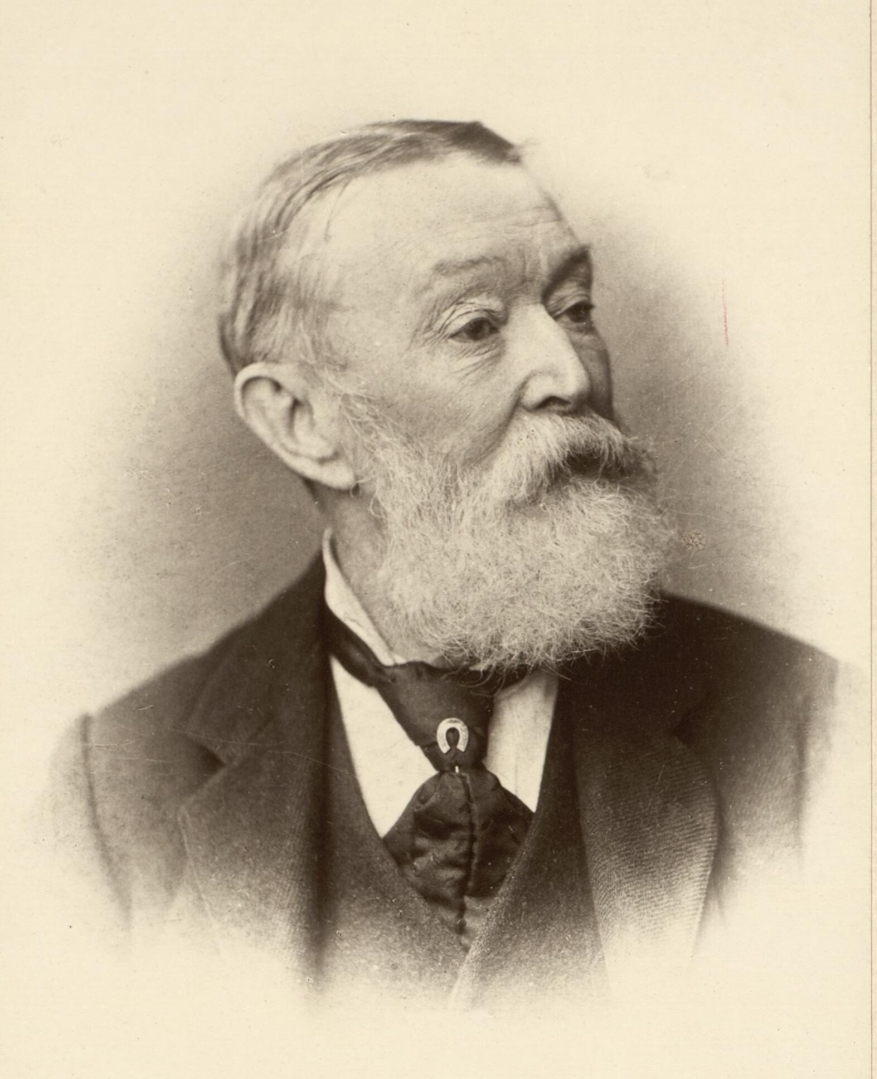
- Born: 4 November 1832; Bedwellty, Monmouthshire, Wales
- Died: 11 January 1902 (aged 69); Aberdare, Rhondda Cynon Taf, Wales

James James (also known by the bardic name Iago ap Ieuan; 1832–1902) was a Welsh harpist and musician from Hollybush, Blackwood, Wales. He composed the tune of the Welsh national anthem Hen Wlad fy Nhadau (also known as Land of my Fathers). Today the same tune is also used for the Breton anthem, Bro Gozh ma Zadoù, and the Cornish anthem, Bro Goth agan Tasow.

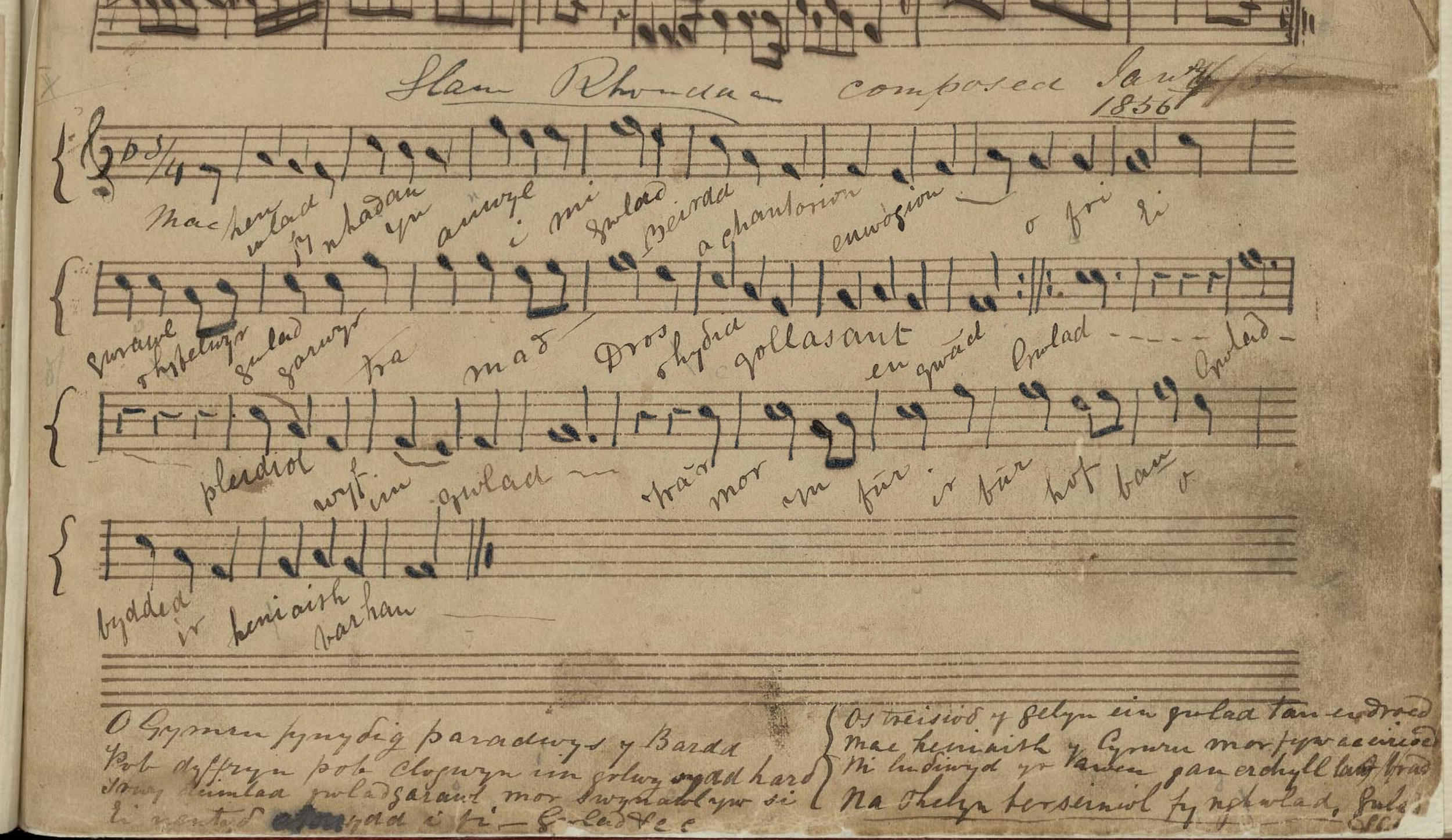
The earliest manuscript of Hen Wlad Fy Nhadau in the hand of the author, Evan James, 1856

== Life ==
James was born on 4 November 1832, at the Ancient Druid Inn, Hollybush, in the parish of Bedwellty, Monmouthshire. He was the son of Evan James (1809–1878) and Elizabeth Stradling of Caerphilly. His father, a Welsh poet who wrote under the pen-name of leuan ab lago, moved with his family to Pontypridd, where he carried on the business of weaver and wool merchant, in about 1844. His son James assisted him in the business.

James James composed the melody which was later to be known as Hen Wlad fy Nhadau in January 1856. Its initial title was Glan Rhondda (The banks of the Rhondda), giving rise to the tradition that the tune had come to James as he walked on the bank of the River Rhondda. His father, Evan James, wrote the lyrics that eventually became the words of the Welsh national anthem.

James James died in Aberdare in the Cynon Valley on 11 January 1902. He was buried in the local cemetery at Aberdare, in the same grave as his wife Cecilia and daughter Louisa.

A memorial to James James and his father, comprising two figures representing the muses of Poetry and Music, stands in Ynysangharad Park, Pontypridd.

== Sources ==
- This article incorporates text from a publication now in the public domain: Thomas, Daniel Lleufer (1912). "James, James". In Lee, Sidney (ed.). Dictionary of National Biography (2nd supplement). Vol. 2. London: Smith, Elder & Co. p. 361.
- Herbert, Trevor. "James, Evan (1809–1878)". Oxford Dictionary of National Biography (online ed.). Oxford University Press. doi:10.1093/ref:odnb/98007. (Subscription, Wikipedia Library access or UK public library membership required.)
