= Evan James (poet) =

Welsh poet, writer of the Welsh national anthem (1809–1878)

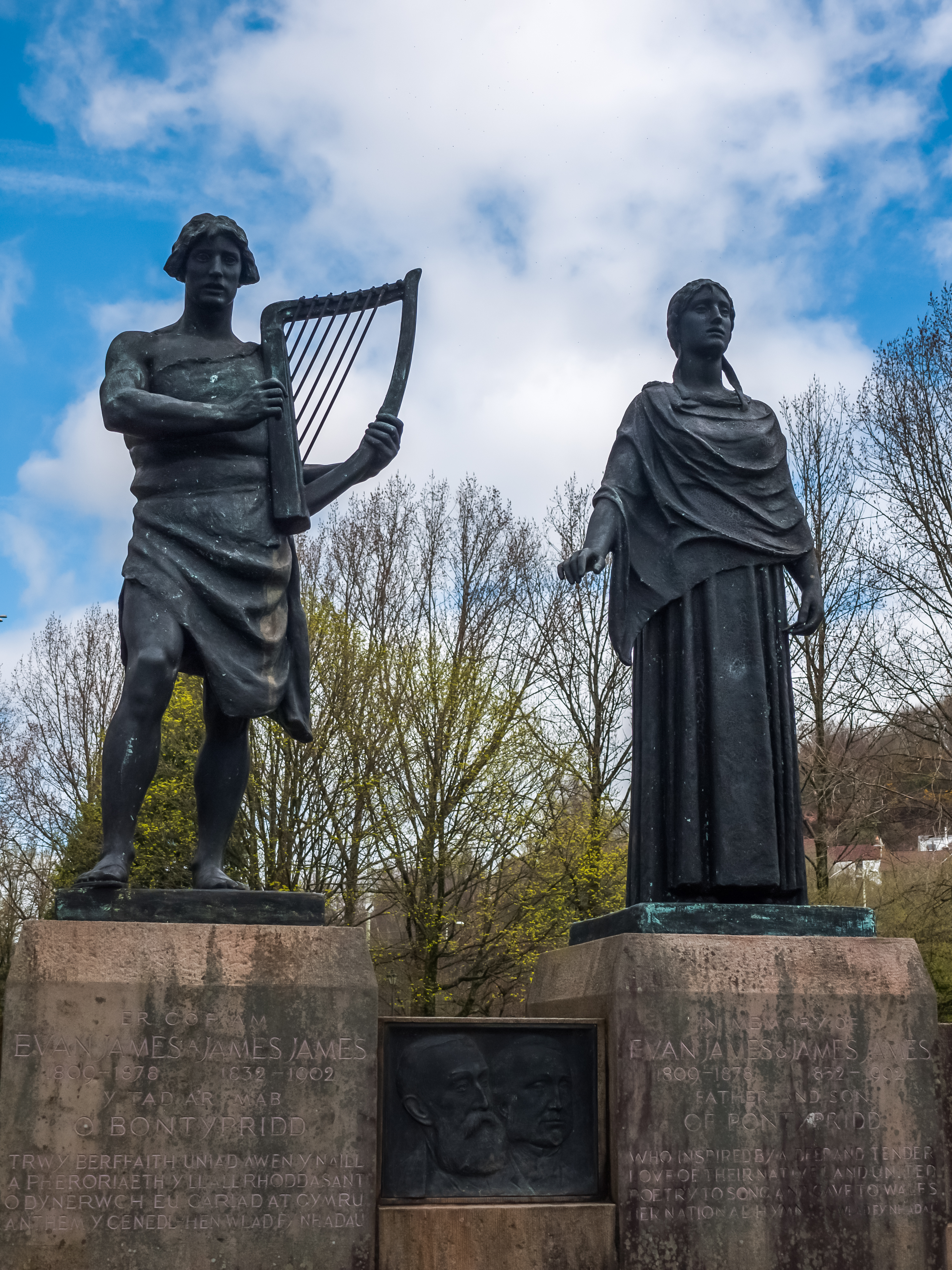
Memorial to Evan James and James James at Ynysangharad Park, Pontypridd

Evan James (also known by the bardic name Ieuan ap Iago) (18 January 1809 – 30 September 1878), was a Welsh weaver and poet from Pontypridd, originally from Caerphilly, Wales, who wrote the lyrics of "Hen Wlad Fy Nhadau" ("Land of my Fathers"), the national anthem of Wales.

"Hen Wlad Fy Nhadau", by Madge Breese for the Gramophone Company (1899) – the first known recording made of any song in the Welsh language

James, a weaver by trade, employed several people at his mill on the bank of the River Rhondda. According to family legend, his son James James, was walking one day in January 1856 on the banks of the river when the melody for Hen Wlad fy Nhadau came to him. When he gave the tune to his father, Evan James was able to compose the words which are the present-day Welsh national anthem. It is likely that James senior was inspired by the fact that two of his brothers had emigrated to the United States and had written in praise of their adoptive country and urging him to join them.

A memorial to Evan James and his son, in the form of two figures, representing Poetry and Music, stands in Ynysangharad War Memorial Park, Pontypridd. Evan's face is shown alongside that of his son, but appears younger because the photographs available to the sculptor, Goscombe John, were taken many years apart.
