= The Big Welsh Bite Food Festival =

Annual food festival in Pontypridd, Wales

- Genre: Food festival
- Dates: August
- Location: Pontypridd
- Founded: 2003
- Founders: Rhondda Cynon Taf County Borough Council
- Attendance: 20,000
- Website: www.bigwelshbite.co.uk

The Big Welsh Bite Food Festival is an annual food festival that is held in Pontypridd.

== Overview ==
The festival was established in 2003 and is held each August in Ynysangharad War Memorial Park which is also home to the National Lido of Wales, a waterside café and bandstand.

The festival is notable for its size, attracting up to 20,000 people over two days, making it a significant event for the town of Pontypridd. Ynysangharad Park is located next to the River Taff with a few of the terraced houses typical of the South Wales Valleys.

== Focus ==
The festival aims to showcase and celebrate local companies and products. According to organisers of the event the festival "stands out and is so popular because all the produce available will be grown, reared, caught, brewed, pickled, baked, smoked or processed by the stallholders themselves". The focus is mainly on food and drink including Welsh cuisine and world food. The festival has also included a cookery stage, chef demonstrations, a bake off and beer garden.

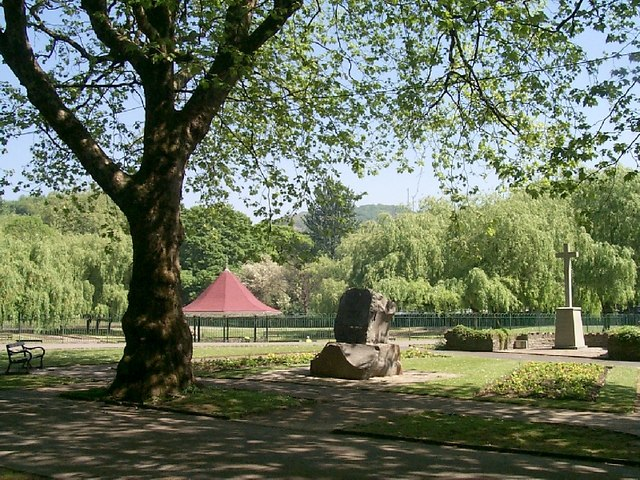
Bandstand and War Monuments, Ynysangharad Park

The festival has also had craft stalls and arena shows and has included a farm area and a Silent World Aquarium.

== Structure and support ==
The festival is organised and run by Rhondda Cynon Taf County Borough Council. The festival has a number of sponsors which have included Glamorgan Brewing Company, local ice cream producer Subzero and the local radio station GTFM 107.9 FM.

The festival has been supported by Welsh Government through the Food Festival Grant Scheme.

== Videos ==
- The Big Welsh Bit Food Festival 2018
