= Gelli, Rhondda =

Coordinates: 51.643352°N 3.478743°W

Gelli: Welsh: Y Gelli
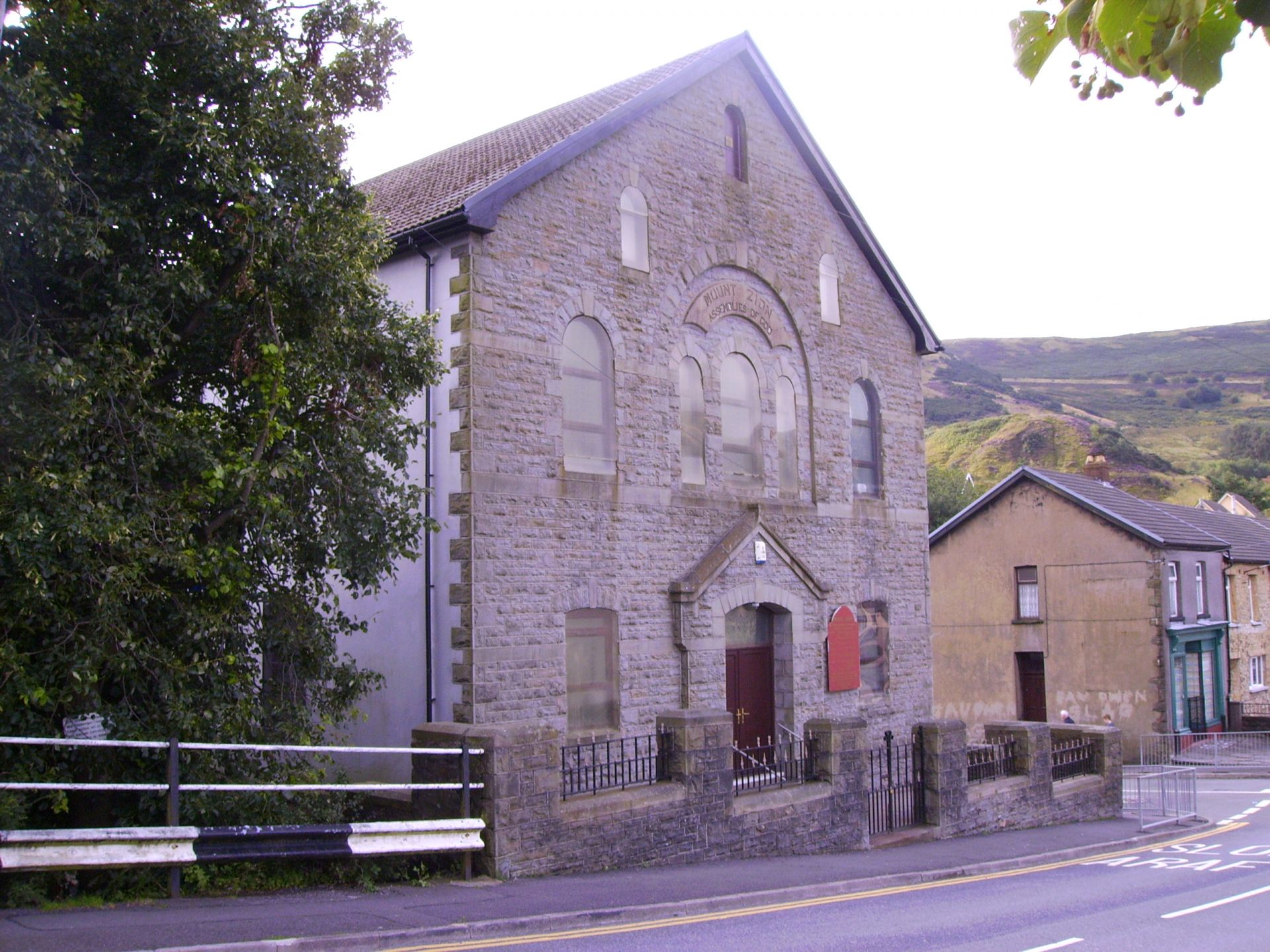
- Mount Zion Chapel, Gelli

- Location within Rhondda Cynon Taf
- OS grid reference: SS977948
- Principal area: Rhondda Cynon Taf
- Preserved county: Mid Glamorgan
- Country: Wales
- Sovereign state: United Kingdom
- Post town: TREORCHY
- Postcode district: CF41 7
- Dialling code: 01443
- Police: South Wales
- Fire: South Wales
- Ambulance: Welsh
- UK Parliament: Rhondda and Ogmore
- Senedd Cymru – Welsh Parliament: Afan Ogwr Rhondda

Gelli is a village in the Rhondda Fawr valley, in the county borough of Rhondda Cynon Taff, Wales, situated on the southern bank of the Rhondda Fawr River. Gelli is a former coal mining village which is a district of the community of Ystrad.

== Early and industrial history ==
The village of Gelli takes its name from a farm that was once found in the area, which translates from the Welsh language roughly as 'small wood or copse'. Before the industrialisation of the area there were few settlements in the area, mainly small agricultural and farm buildings. Archeological finds in the area have provided proof of earlier populations, mainly Bronze Age, though Gelli does house one of only two definite Romano-British finds in the Rhondda Valleys. Roman finds in the uplands of Glamorgan are scarce, but the settlement at Hen Dre'r Gelli, excavated in 1903, is the only undefended settlement of its type in the Rhondda. A lengthy archaeological report was published in 1906, but little remains of the site, with much destroyed during the construction of the Nant y Gwyddon refuse tip.

== Modern Gelli ==
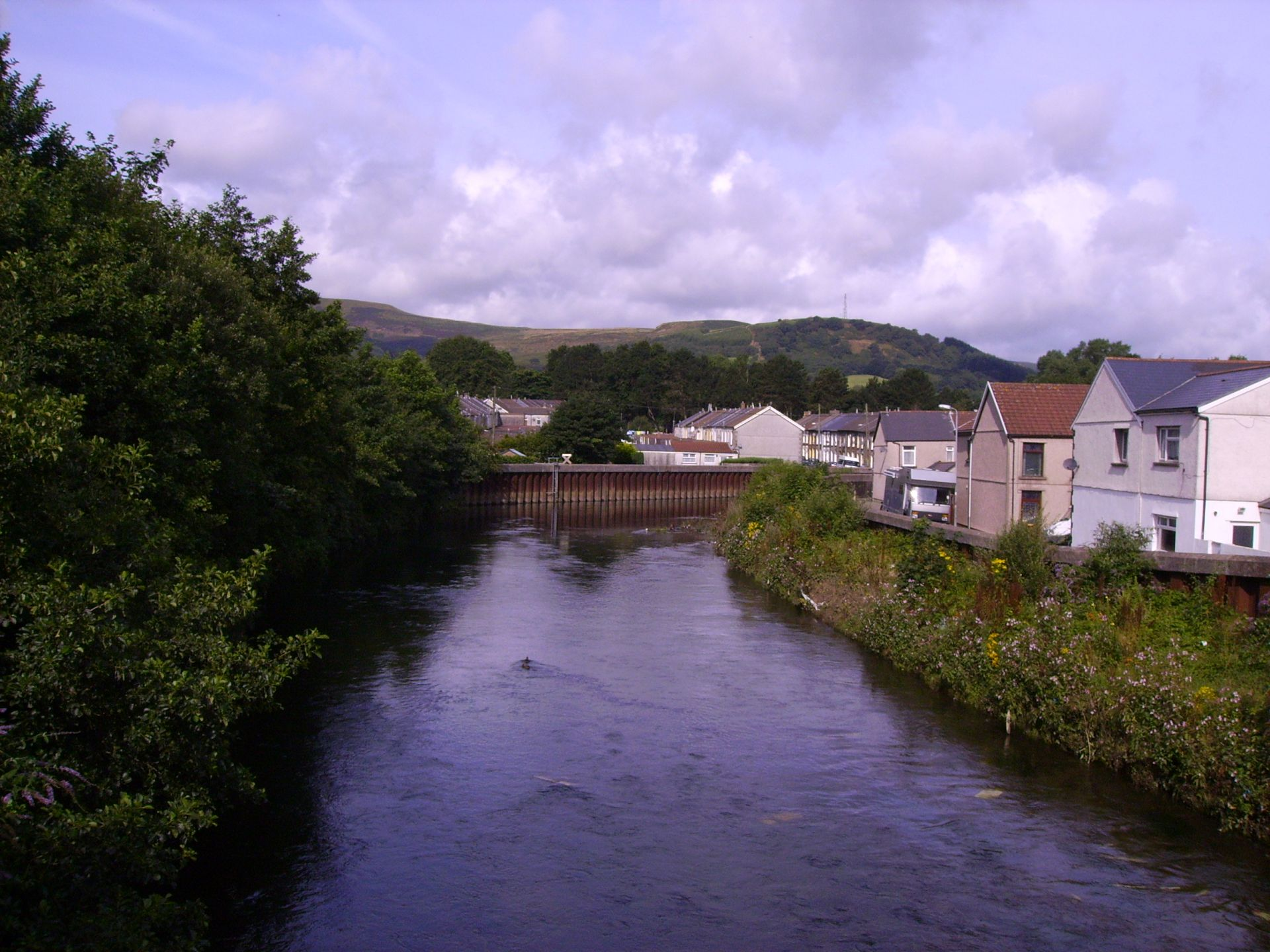
River Rhondda showing flood defences at Gelli

Gelli (Nantgwyddon) was also home to a landfill site which has been at the centre of controversial reports connecting it with birth defects in children born in the nearby vicinity. The reports resulted in a full scale environmental report, and the decision by the local authorities to cease the dumping of domestic waste at the site.

== Education ==
Gelli Primary School, located on Ystrad Road, is the English language primary school that serves the village. Ysgol Gyfun Gynradd Bronllwyn is a Welsh medium primary school serving Gelli and surrounding area.
