= Bro Gozh ma Zadoù =

Anthem of Brittany, France

English: Old Land of My Fathers
- National anthem of Brittany
- Lyrics: François Jaffrennou, 1897
- Music: James James, 1856
- Adopted: 1903

Audio sample
- file; help

"Bro Gozh ma Zadoù" (Kerneveg Breton pronunciation: [bʀoː ɡoːz‿ma ˈzɑːdu]; French: Vieux pays de mes ancêtres; "Old Land of My Fathers") is the anthem of Brittany. It is sung to the same tune as that of the national anthem of Wales, "Hen Wlad Fy Nhadau", and has similar lyrics. The Cornish anthem, "Bro Goth Agan Tasow", is also sung to the same tune.

This anthem is played during major sporting events at the final of the Coupe de France between the Stade Rennais F.C. and the En Avant Guingamp, at the end of a day's broadcasting on the local radio station Bretagne 5, as well as cultural events.

== History ==
The Breton lyrics are the creation of François Jaffrennou (Taldir) in 1897, and the music was that composed by James James, of Pontypridd, Wales, for "Hen Wlad Fy Nhadau". The new song was first published in 1898 and circulated as "Henvelidigez" ("Adaptation"). It was chosen as the national anthem (and a song to celebrate friendship between the Welsh and Bretons) in 1903, at a Congress of the Union Régionaliste Bretonne held in Lesneven, Brittany (France). Maurice Duhamel adapted it for piano, and it was first recorded by Pathé in 1910.

In November 2021, it became the official anthem of Brittany with a new arrangement by Frédérique Lory played by the Orchestre National de Bretagne (National Orchestra of Brittany) in partnership with Comité Bro Gozh ma Zadoù and Coop Breizh.

== Lyrics ==
Breton original

I
Ni, Breizhiz a galon, karomp hon gwir vro!
Brudet eo an Arvor dre ar bed tro-dro.
Dispont 'kreiz ar brezel, hon tadoù ken mat,
A skuilhas eviti o gwad.

Chorus:
O! Breizh, ma bro, me 'gar ma bro.
Tra ma vo mor 'vel mur 'n he zro,
Ra vezo digabestr ma bro!

II
Breizh, douar ar Sent (Note: Sometimes written as Zent, zent or Sent.) Kozh, douar ar varzhed,
N'eus bro all a garan kement 'barzh ar bed.
Pep menez, pep traoñienn d'am c'halon zo ker,
Eno 'kousk meur a Vreizhad taer! (Note: Sometimes written têr.)

Chorus

III
Ar Vretoned 'zo (Note: Sometimes written a zo.) tud kalet ha kreñv.
N'eus pobl ken kalonek a-zindan an neñv.
Gwerz trist, son dudius a ziwan enno.
O! pegen kaer ez (Note: Sometimes written ec'h [ex].) out, ma bro!

Chorus

IV
Mard eo bet trec'het Breizh er brezelioù bras,
He yezh a zo bepred ken bev ha biskoazh,
He c'halon virvidik a lamm c'hoazh 'n he c'hreiz.
Dihunet out bremañ, ma Breizh!

𝄆 Chorus 𝄇

IPA transcription (Note: See Help:IPA/Breton, Breton language § Phonology and Breton language § Orthography. The transcription is based on the Kerneveg dialect, the most spoken dialect.)

1
[niː bʀɛi̯.ziz‿a ˈɡɑː.lɔ̃n kaˈʀom(b)‿ɔ̃n ɡwiːʀ vʀoː]
[ˈbʀyː.ded‿eː ɑ̃n ˈaʀ.voʀ dʀeː aʀ bet tʀoː.dʀoː]
[ˈdis.pɔ̃n(t) kʀɛi̯z‿aʀ ˈbʀeː.zel ɔ̃n ˈtɑː.du ken mɑːt]
[a ˈskɥiː.ʎaz‿e.viː.ti o ɡwɑːt]

[o bʀɛi̯s ma bʀoː meː ɡaʀ ma bʀoː]
[tʀɑː ma voː moːʀ vel myʀ‿(e)n e zʀoː]
[ʀɑː ˈveː.zo diˈɡɑː.best(χ) ma bʀoː]

2
[bʀɛi̯z‿ˈduː.aʀ aʀ zen(t) koːz‿ˈduː.aʀ aʀ ˈvaʀ.zet]
[nø(ː)z‿bʀoː alː a ˈɡɑː.ʀɑ̃n ˈkeː.men(d)‿baʀz‿aʀ bet]
[peb‿ˈmeː.ne(s) pep ˈtʀaɔ̃.jenː dam ˈhɑː.lɔ̃n zo keːʀ]
[eː.no kuzɡ‿møʀ a ˈvʀɛi̯.zat tɛːʀ]

3
[aʀ vʀeˈtoː.ned‿a zo tyt ˈkɑː.led‿a kʀẽ(ː)(v)]
[nø(ː)s pop(ɬ) ken kaˈloː.neɡ‿aˈzin.dɑ̃n ɑ̃n nẽ(ː)(v)]
[ɡweʀs tʀist sɔ̃n dyˈdiː.yz‿a ˈziː.wɑ̃n ˈen.no]
[o ˈpeː.ɡen kɛːʀ ez‿ud‿ma bʀoː]

4
[maʀd‿eː bet ˈtʀeː.xed‿bʀɛi̯z‿eʀ bʀeˈzeː.li(.)u bʀɑːs]
[e jeːz‿a zo ˈbeː.pʁet ken beːw a ˈbis.kɔ̯as]
[e ˈhɑː.lɔ̃n viʀˈviː.diɡ‿a lamː hɔ̯az‿(e)n e hʀɛi̯s]
[diˈhyː.ned‿ud‿ˈbʀeː.mɑ̃ ma bʀɛi̯s]

English translation

I
We, Bretons by heart, love our true country,
Armorica, famous worldwide.
Any fear in battle without, our such good fathers,
For thee shed their blood.

Chorus:
Brittany, my country, I love my country,
So long as the sea, like a wall surrounding thee,
My country shall be free!

II
Brittany, land of old Saints, land of bards,
There is no other country I love as much.
Ev'ry mountain, ev'ry glen to my heart dearest,
There rest many heroic Bretons.

Chorus

III
The Bretons, a people strong and valiant,
No people under the skies are as brave as them,
Whether they may sing a sad gwerz or a nice song.
O my very beautiful country!

Chorus

IV
If in past Brittany may have been in battle defeated,
Her language shall always remain well alive.
Her flaming heart still in her chest beateth,
Thou art now awakened, my dear Brittany!

𝄆 Chorus 𝄇
