= Jack Owen (disambiguation) =

Jack Owen (born 1967) is a death metal guitarist.

Jack Owen may also refer to:

- Jack Owen (footballer) (1866–?), Welsh football player for Manchester United
- Jack Owen (trade unionist) (c. 1890–1983), English trade unionist
- Jack E. Owen of Tepper Aviation

== See also ==
- John Owen (disambiguation)
- Jack Owens (disambiguation)
