= John Owens =

John Owens may refer to:

- John Owens (merchant) (1790–1846), English merchant
- John Owens (Australian politician) (1809–1866), doctor and politician in Victoria, Australia
- John E. Owens (1824–1886), English-American comedian
- John G. Owens (1865–1893), American archaeologist
- John W. Owens (1884–1968), editorial writer on the Baltimore Sun
- John Reginald Owens (1890–1944), English footballer also known as Reg Owens
- John Sidney Owens (1893–1965), American pursuit pilot and World War I flying ace
- John Owens (Gaelic footballer) (born 1966), Irish Gaelic footballer
- John B. Owens (born 1971), American lawyer and federal appellate judge
- Johnny Owens (born 1977), Canadian drummer
- John Owens (American football) (born 1980), American football tight end

== See also ==
- Jack Owens (disambiguation)
- John Owen (disambiguation)
