= Jack Owens =

Jack Owens may refer to:

- Jack Owens (blues singer) (1904–1997), American Delta blues singer and guitarist
- Jack Owens (footballer) (1902–1942), Australian rules footballer who played for Glenelg during the 1920s and 1930s
- Jack Owens (singer-songwriter) (1912–1982), American singer/songwriter, pianist, known as "The Cruising Crooner"
- Jack Owens (baseball) (1908–1958), American baseball player
- Jack Owens (rugby league) (born 1994), rugby league player
- Jack Owens (basketball) (born 1977), basketball coach
- Jack Owens (rugby union) (born 1995), Irish rugby player

== See also ==
- John Owens (disambiguation)
- Jack Owen (disambiguation)
