= John Simpson Owen =

Ugandan-born British conservationist

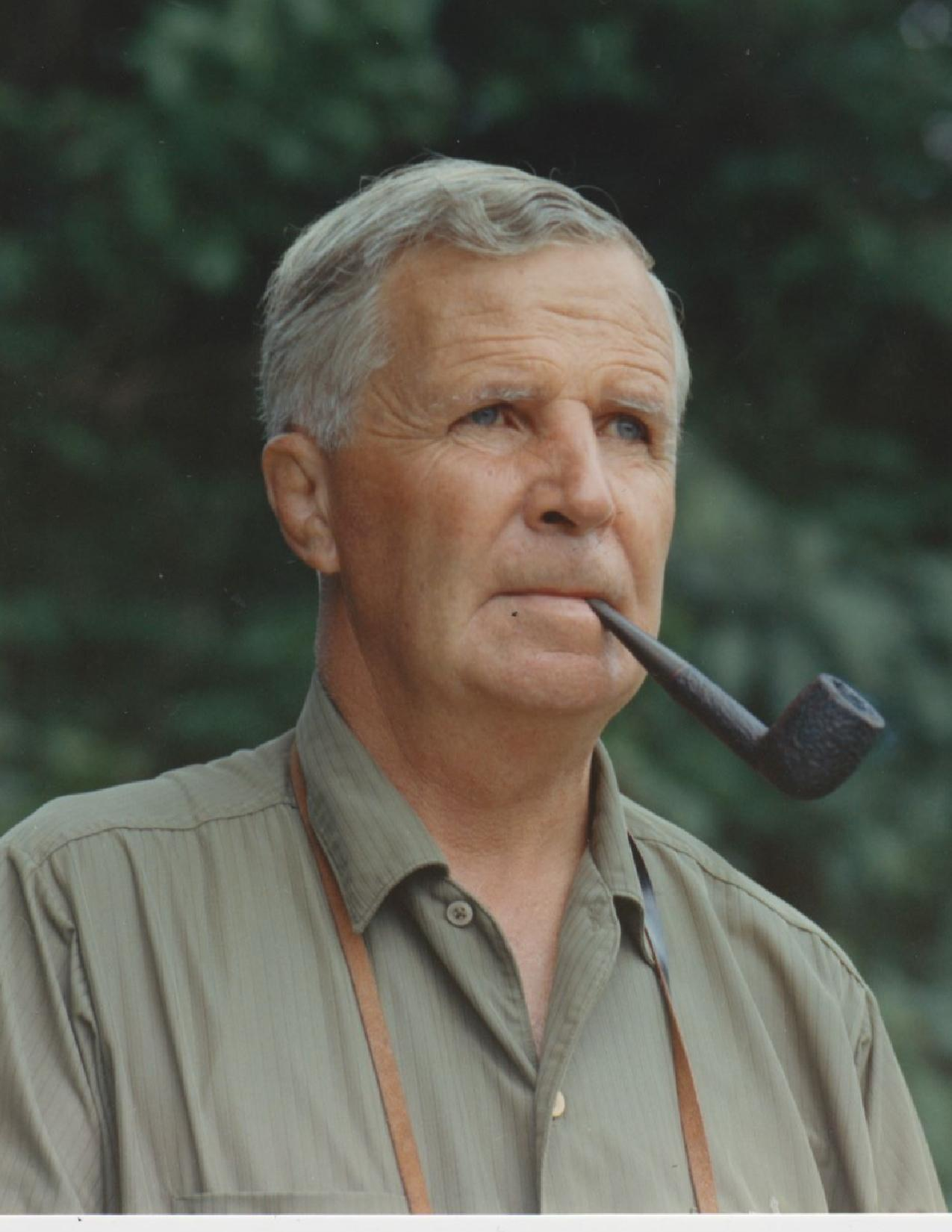
- John Simpson Owen, 1970

Director of the Tanzania National Parks
- In office 1963-1972

Director of the Tanganyika National Parks
- In office 1960-1963

Personal details
- Born: 31 December 1912 Taro, Uganda
- Died: 23 February 1995 (aged 82)
- Education: Brasenose College, Oxford

John Simpson Owen (31 December 1912 – 23 February 1995) was a Ugandan-born British conservationist who served as Director of the Tanzania National Parks from 1960 to 1972, during which time he was responsible for the establishment and management a network of National Parks, the Promotion of Scientific Research as a basis for conservation and wildlife tourism in the Serengeti National Park. He was awarded the World Wildlife Fund Gold Medal in 1973 for this and its contribution to the economy of a developing country. He was also the recipient of the Order of the Golden Arc from Prince Bernhard of the Netherlands.

He was appointed as an officer of the Order of the British Empire in 1955 for his campaigning work to secure the future pensions of the Sudanese Civil Servants.

== Early life and education ==
John Simpson Owen was born on 31 December 1912, in Taro, in the foothills of the Ruwenzori Mountains of Uganda. The eldest of 3 sons, his parents, Walter Edwin Owen and Lucy Olive Walton, were missionaries with the Church Missionary Society.

He attended Christs Hospital School in Sussex (1922–1932). He attended Brasenose College, Oxford University (1932–1935), where he was awarded a Hulme Exhibition in natural science. He was awarded a B.A. (in Chemistry) on 17 October 1935 and an M.A. (in Biology) on 29 July 1972. He also completed a diploma in Anthropology.

== Career ==
=== 1936–1954 ===
Owen joined the Sudan Political Service in 1936, remaining until independence at which time he was Deputy Governor. He founded the Nimule National Park to protect the local white rhinoceros which he believed to be under threat.

In 1953 he moved to Khartoum part of the team facilitating transition to independence of the Sudan.

=== 1960–1973 ===
He was appointed director of Tanganyika National Parks in 1960. In 1961 Tanganyika gained its independence and in 1963 became the country of Tanzania. He remained in post through to 1972. Owen presented a paper Awakening Public Opinion To The Value Of The Tanganyika National Parks at the Conference on the Conservation of Nature and Natural Resources in Modern African States (known as the Arusha Conference) in September 1961. In the paper he identified 5 themes which formed the basis of his vision for the value of the parks to the country.

1. Possession: The Parks belong to the people, and are run primarily for their benefit.
2. Pride in the national heritage of their Parks which are world-famous.
3. Profit from the tourist trade, still with its potential barely assessed.
4. Pleasure in seeing the animals, which figure so largely in African folk-lore, in their natural state;
5. Posterity the desirability of preserving representatives of the many animals which are Africa's heritage for their children and their children's grandchildren to see and enjoy.

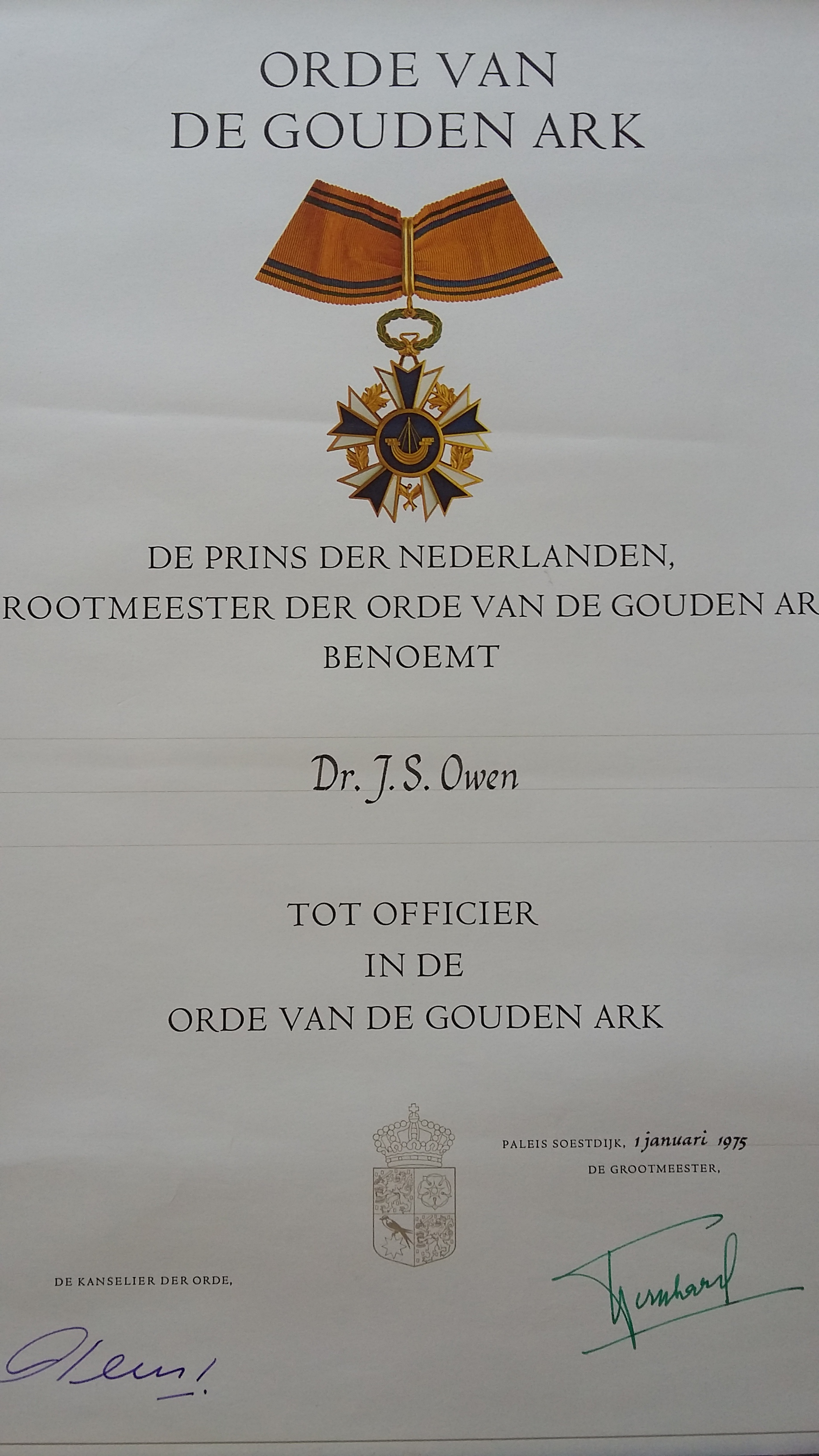
Order of the Golden Arc

His involvement is recognised by Bernard Grzimek in his book Rhinos Belong to Everybody, where he is included in the foreword for his efforts to create the park system.

His most lasting achievement was transforming a small laboratory into the world-renowned Serengeti Scientific Research Institute. The Institute attracted many scientists to work there or to visit, including the Nobel-prize winner Niko Tinbergen and his students. In 1966 George Schaller came to study the lions, resulting in his book Serengeti Lion: A Study of Predator–Prey Relations. The dedication at the front of his book Serengeti a Kingdom of Predators was "To John S. Owen whose vision and initiative have helped to create in Tanzania some of the world's finest national parks". Hans Kruuk came to study the hyena, Harvey Croze joined in the late 1960s to study the impact of the elephants on the woodlands and Michael Norton-Griffiths studied the Serengeti ecology.

Field researchers were also based in other parks; Iain Douglas Hamilton studied the elephants in the rift valley Manyara National Park and Jane Goodall studied the chimpanzees in the Gombe Stream which moved under the National Park umbrella in 1968. His involvement in the parks is described in Peter Mattherson's The Tree where Man was Born.

In 1973 Owen left Africa for the Woodrow Wilson International Center for Scholars in Washington, D.C., the think tank on global ecology.

== Later life ==
After his retirement to Tunbridge Wells he fought and won several quixotic campaigns against planning authorities including preserving the medieval forest of High Wood near Tunbridge Wells from development, but he did not manage to prevent the Channel tunnel from being built.

== Awards and honours ==
In 1955 Owen was awarded the OBE for his campaigning work on pensions for ex-colonial officers. In 1971 he was made an Honorary Doctor of Science at Oxford University for his contribution to conservation, and in the same year, he was awarded the World Wildlife Fund Gold Medal. In 1975 he was awarded the Order of the Golden Arc by Prince Bernhard of the Netherlands, the inaugural president of the World Wildlife Fund.
