= John Glendwr Owen =

British civil servant (1914–1977)

- Born: May 12, 1914
- Died: 14 February 1977 (aged 62)
- Occupation: Civil servant

John Glendwr Owen CB (1914-1977) was a senior British civil servant.

== Biography ==
Born on 12 May 1914, John Glendwr Owen was educated at Bedford School and at Balliol College, Oxford. He entered the War Office in 1937 and transferred to HM Treasury in 1938. After serving in the Grenadier Guards during the Second World War he returned to HM Treasury and was Under Secretary at HM Treasury between 1959 and 1973.

John Glendwr Owen died on 14 February 1977.
