= Tich Gwilym =

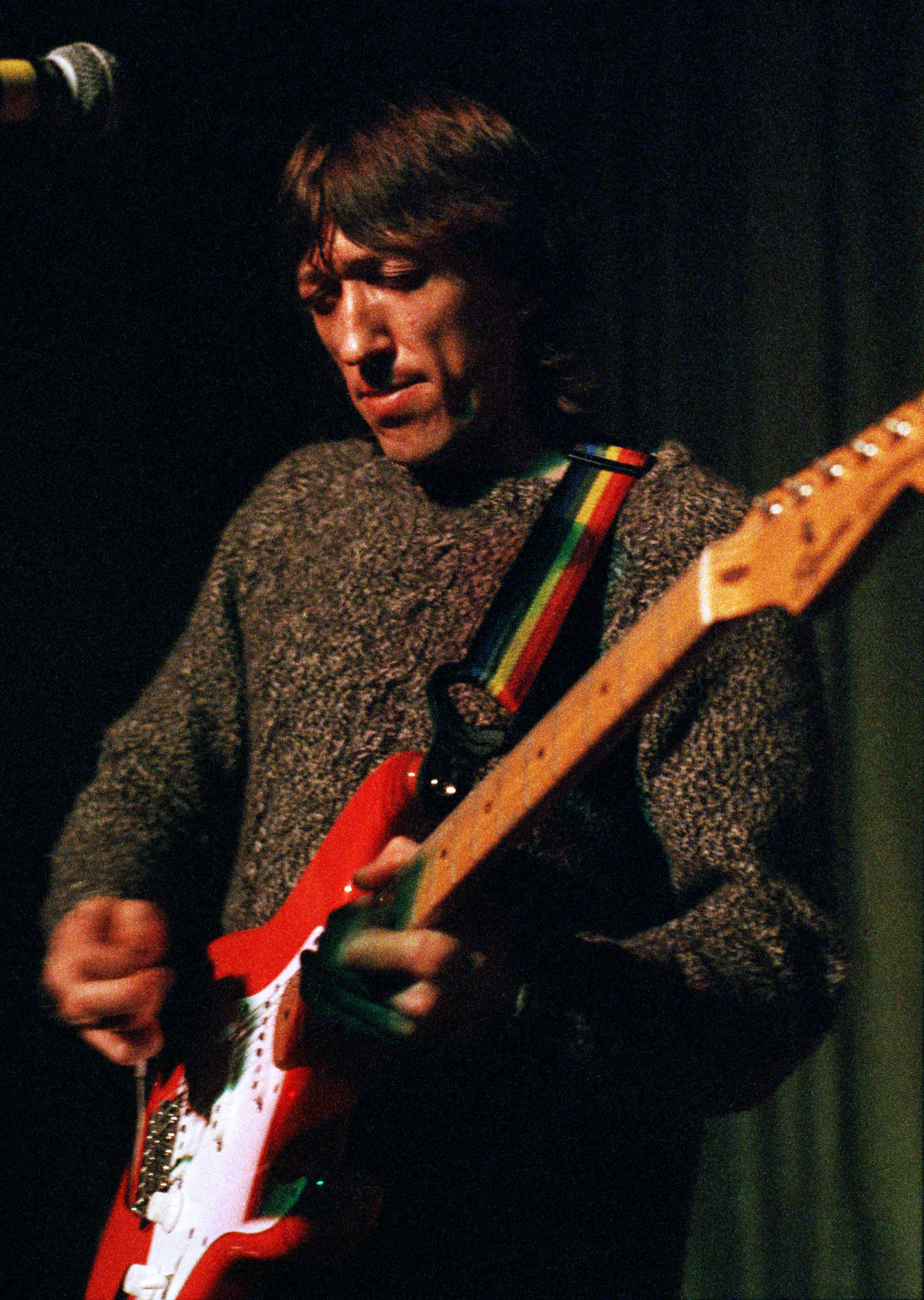
- Tich Gwilym performing in 1985

Background information
- Born: Robert Gwilliam; 10 September 1950; Llwynypia, Wales
- Died: 19 June 2005 (aged 54) Canton, Wales
- Genres: Hard rock, blues-rock, progressive rock, Reggae
- Occupation: Musician
- Instrument: Guitar
- Years active: 1966–2005
- Formerly of: Kimla Taz, Superclarks, Mrs Hugget, Budgie

Tich Gwilym (10 September 1950 – 19 June 2005), born Robert Gwilliam, was a Welsh rock guitarist who was most notable for his Hendrix inspired version of the Welsh national anthem, Hen Wlad Fy Nhadau, considered one of the most famous renditions of the song.

== Musical career ==
Tich was born in Llwynypia, in the Rhondda Valley on 10 September 1950. One of Tich's earliest bands was Kimla Taz, who he played with during the late 1960s. Although the band never gained any mainstream success, they were popular in South Wales and in 1969 played at the Croeso '69 Blues Festival at Abergavenny, alongside the likes of Fleetwood Mac and Jethro Tull.

He played with many rock bands during the 70's such as Memphis Bend, Red Beans & Rice, and Racing Cars. He played with Tiger Bay at the "Moon Club" for 2/3 years prior to joining Geraint Jarman on a full-time basis.Tich found fame in the latter 1970s, when as part of The Geraint Jarman band he recorded the Welsh National Anthem on electric guitar. The Jimi Hendrix inspired version, first appeared on Jarman's 1978 album also called Hen Wlad Fy Nhadau, became synonymous with Tich. This track later appeared on compilation albums of various Welsh artists. In 2006, an eight track recording of the Welsh National Anthem was 'discovered' in London. At the time it was alleged that this was a lost version by Hendrix, though others claimed that it was a rendition by Tich. When approached, ex-band member Geraint Jarman dismissed both claims, stating that "It's definitely not Tich because his style was more like Hendrix's than the tape". It was later discovered that the tape version was a hoax, perpetrated by record producer Martin Davies and ex-guitarist of The Vibrators, John Ellis.

During the 1980's Tich had a day-job working as a session guitarist for the BBC. He also played the "charango" with a South American group Los Ionisos who played authentic ethnic music. Los Ionisos recorded a self titled CD.Around 83/84 he played in a duo "Phil & Tich" every week at the Royal Oak until it was superseded by The Superclarks. In 1989, Tich formed three-piece band the Superclarks with Burke Shelley of Welsh band Budgie. Burke - later replaced by bass player/vocalist Peter Morgan. The Superclarks lasted until 1993 when Morgan moved to the USA. In the 1990s Tich also played alongside Welsh folk singer Siân James, joining her on a tour of Japan in 1998.Tich played in 3-piece Cardiff band "Mrs. Hugget" for period 2000-2005.

== Death ==
In 2005, Tich was staying in a house in Canton in Cardiff. A fire broke out, after an unattended candle lit by the owner accidentally set clothes alight. Tich became trapped in the attic and was overcome by thick smoke and poisonous gases. An inquest into the fire in 2006 recorded a verdict of accidental death. A memorial concert was held for Tich at the Coal Exchange in Cardiff, and featured Welsh acts such as Man, Sassafras, The Boogie Men and Mrs.Hugget (with GlynKnight).
