= John Owen (dean of Clonmacnoise) =

Anglican priest in Ireland (1686–1760)

John Owen (1686–1760) was an Anglican priest in Ireland during the 18th century.

Owen was born in Dublin and educated at Trinity College Dublin. He was Prebendary of St Michael's in Christ Church Cathedral, Dublin from 1736 to 1746 and of St John's from then until his death. He was Dean of Clonmacnoise from 1742 until his death. In 1744 Owen became Prebendary of Swords in St Patrick's Cathedral, Dublin, again holding the post until his death.
