= John Owen (Owain Alaw) =

Welsh poet and musician (1821–1883)

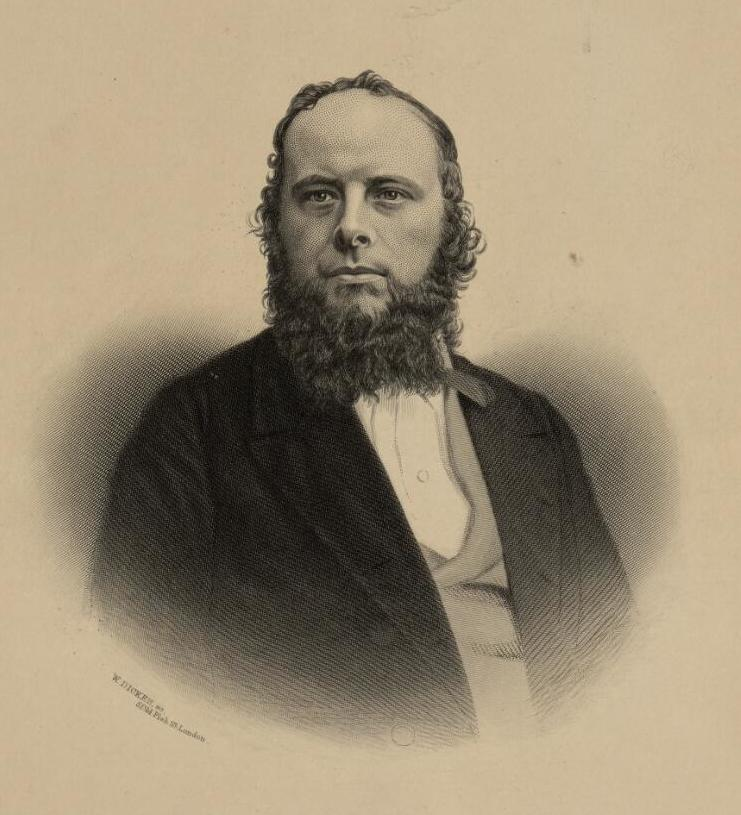
- Portrait of John Owen by William Dickes
- Born: November 14, 1821; Chester, England
- Died: January 29, 1883 (aged 61)
- Spouse: Miss Williams (m. 1842)
- Writing career
- Pen name: Owain Alaw Pencerdd
- Language: Welsh

John Owen, also known by his bardic name Owain Alaw Pencerdd (November 14, 1821 – January 29, 1883), was a Welsh-language poet and also a musician.

== Early life ==
Owen was born and raised in Chester, England, just across the border from Wales. He was apprenticed as a young man to a cutler, but he also studied music and the organ, and became the organist at the Countess of Huntingdon's Chapel, as well as conductor of the Octagon Orchestral Society. He married a Miss Williams in 1842, and in 1844 gave up his business to devote himself to music full time.

== Music career ==
For the next few years he held organist positions at St Paul's Church, Broughton, Wrexham, and in Chester at St Bride's Church, and then as organist and choirmaster at St Mary's Welsh Church. From that period came his earliest music ("Calfari", published in the Haleliwia collection of 1849), and soon after, his first major success, at the Rhuddlan eisteddfod of 1851, with his composition "Deborah a Barac".

During the 1850s, Owen continued to achieve much success at eisteddfodau throughout Wales and at similar events in England. In his later years he became widely sought after to adjudicate in these competitions.

== "Hen Wlad fy Nhadau" ==
At the Llangollen national eisteddfod in 1858, Owen (who was an adjudicator) and others in attendance were treated for the first time to the recently penned anthem "Glan Rhondda", part of the selection of Thomas Llewelyn (Llewelyn Alaw) of Aberdare. Llewelyn went on to share first prize at the eisteddfod, and Owen was clearly impressed by the tune.

Owen played a major role in popularising "Glan Rhondda", singing it at concerts throughout North Wales, and then publishing it in his widely used Gems of Welsh Melody collection of 1860 (where he gave it the more familiar modern name, "Hen Wlad Fy Nhadau").

== Later life ==
Owen continued to compose, perform and adjudicate in his later years, while also editing and contributing to several collections of Welsh music and poetry that were published in the 1860s and 1870s, including Tonau yr Ysgol Sabothol and Y Gyfres Gerddorol. Of his own works, several songs appeared in Y Gyfres Gerddorol and other collections. His oratorio Jeremiah was published in 1878.

John Owen died on 29 January 1883 at the age of 61, and was buried in Chester.

== Eisteddfod honours ==
- Rhuddlan, 1851: "Deborah a Barac"
- Tremadoc, 1851: "Gweddi Habacuc" (tied with John Ambrose Lloyd)
- London, 1855: "Can Mair"
- Merthyr Tydfil: "Y Ddaeargryn"
- Llanrwst, 1859: "Arnat Ti y Llefais"
- Caernarfon: "Tywysog Cymru"
- Chester, 1866: "Gŵyl Gwalia"
