= Jon Owen =

American luger (born 1963)

Jon Owen (born December 13, 1963) is an American luge official who competed in the sport in the late 1980s. He is best known for becoming the first person to slide down the bobsleigh, luge, and skeleton track used for the 2002 Winter Olympics in January 1997 at the Park City, Utah venue.

Owen finished 23rd in the men's singles event at the 1988 Winter Olympics in Calgary. He later became a development coach for the U.S. Luge Team, and was honored as a development coach of the year by the United States Olympic Committee in 1996.

While a development coach for the U.S. team in Park City, Owen developed a luge sled for the disabled which was presented for use in 2010.

He serves as Western Regional Coordinator for USA Luge in Park City. In 2020 Owen coached Team USA Luge at the Lausanne Winter Youth Olympic Games.
