= River Rhondda =

River in south Wales

Coordinates: 51.61591°N 3.41074°W

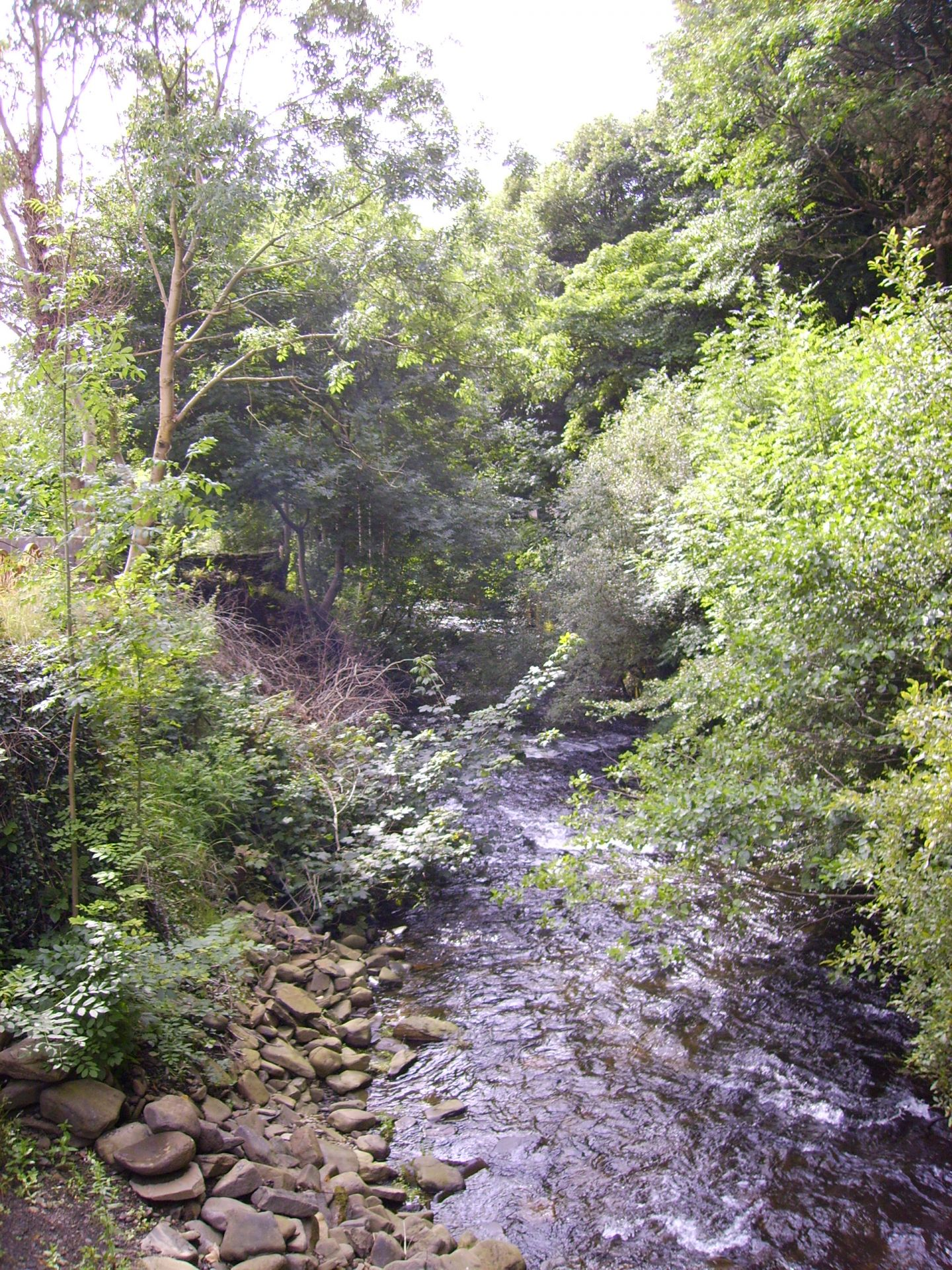
Near the source, Blaenrhondda

The River Rhondda (Welsh: Afon Rhondda) is a river in South Wales with two major tributaries, Rhondda Fawr (meaning big Rhondda) and Rhondda Fach (meaning little Rhondda).

== Description ==
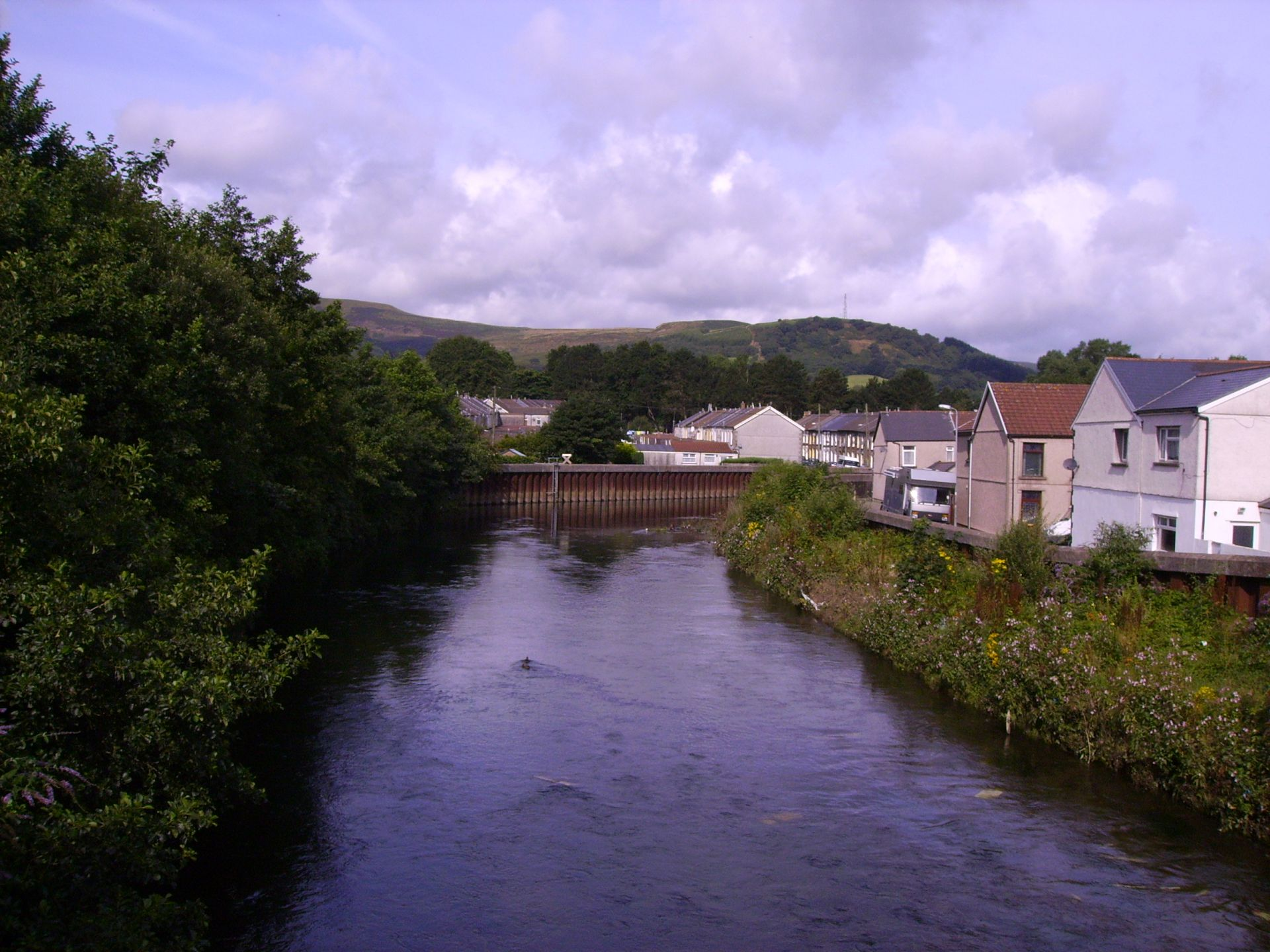
Rhondda Fawr flood walls at Gelli

The river has two major tributaries, the Rhondda Fawr and the Rhondda Fach (respectively, the "big" and the "little" Rhondda). Despite these names, both tributaries are of similar length. Both valleys display the U-shape cross-sections typical of glaciated valleys, having been eroded during successive ice ages. They cut deeply into the thick South Wales Coal measures which comprise sandstones and mudstones and coal seams of Carboniferous age. The whole form of the river and its surrounding urbanisation has been dominated by coal mining and the communities that grew up to exploit the rich coal seams. Much of the valley has suffered severe subsidence because of the removal of coal from beneath the valley floor. The houses and streets have subsided with the result that river levels are, in parts, higher than the surrounding houses. In order to contain the river and prevent flooding, walls have been built, sometimes across the ends of streets - these are known as "The Rhondda walls".

== Course ==
The Rhondda Fawr has its source on the eastern side of Craig y Llyn south of Llyn Fawr in a spring called Ffynnon y Gwalciau at an elevation of about 544m OD. The main head stream, Nant Carn Moesen (or Nant Carfoesen) runs down a plateau slope for about a mile and drops steeply, joining with the Nant Garreg-lwyd and the Nant Melyn to form the Rhondda. The combined waters then continue descending sharply through a mountain gorge to the foot of Pen Pych. The river runs through Blaenrhondda where it is joined by the Nant y Gwair, and runs down the Rhondda Valley, (Welsh: Cwm Rhondda). The river then passes through a string of mining towns and villages including Treherbert, Treorchy, Pentre, Ton Pentre, Ystrad Rhondda, Llwynypia, Tonypandy (joined by the Nant Clydach), Dinas and Porth where it joins its sister tributary.

The Rhondda Fach rises about a mile to the east of the source of the Rhondda Fawr on the hills above Blaenrhondda in a marshy area between Mynydd Beili Glas and Mynydd Bwllfa at an elevation of 489m OD. The fledgling river is first contained in the Lluest-wen Reservoir before flowing down into Maerdy and then on through Ferndale, Tylorstown, Ynyshir to its confluence at Porth.

The River Rhondda flows on past Trehafod to reach its confluence with the River Taff at Pontypridd.

== Improving water quality ==
The mining industry had a catastrophic impact on the quality of the river with all the mine waters being pumped straight into the river with no treatment. For very long periods, probably more than a century, the river was continuously black with coal solids and little if anything could live in the river. This was compounded by the very basic sewage disposal arrangements which saw all the sewage discharged into the same river. Not until the 1970s was there real investment made in improving the sewage treatment arrangements.

Since the early 1970s the river has been steadily improving in quality largely due to the closure of all the coal mines and through the investment in sewerage and sewage treatment.

== Bibliography ==
- Lewis, E.D. (1959). The Rhondda Valleys. London: Phoenix House.
