= List of medieval bestiaries =

This is a list of medieval bestiaries. The bestiary form is commonly divided into "families," as proposed in 1928 by M. R. James and revised by Florence McCulloch in 1959–1962. In the absence of popular culture books, people in the Middle Ages in Europe took superstition for granted, and the unthinkable can easily be accepted as the undisputed truth. Today, everyone knows what a dog or a bee is, but at that time, fabulous stories were considered non-fiction. In the Middle Ages, stories glorified boring times, and people value them. At that time, people particularly liked stories about animals. As there were no other sources of information, the most sought after these bestiaries/”animal books”.

== Latin bestiaries ==
=== First family ===
The subfamily designated the "B-Is" version, dated to the 10th–13th centuries, are based upon the "B" version of the Physiologus and the writings of Isidore of Seville:

- Cambridge, Corpus Christi College, MS 22
- London, British Library Royal MS 2.C.xii
- London, British Library Stowe MS 1067
- Los Angeles, Getty Museum Ludwig XV 3
- Los Angeles, Getty Museum Ludwig XV 4
- Oxford, Bodleian Library MS Bodley 602
- Oxford, Bodleian Library MS Douce 167
- Oxford, Bodleian Library MS Laud Misc. 247
- Paris, Bibliothèque Nationale Nouv. acq. lat. 873
- Vatican, Cod. Palat. lat. 1074

The "H" versions, late 13th-century, which in addition to a base Physiologus text, adds and arranges the content according to the "H" text or Book II of De bestiis et aliis rebus of Hugues de Fouilloy (olim of Pseudo-Hugo de St. Victor).

- Cambridge, Sidney Sussex College 100
- Chalon-sur-Saône, Bibliothèque Municipale MS 14
- Paris, Bibliothèque Nationale lat. 2495A
- Paris, Bibliothèque Nationale lat. 2495B
- Paris, Bibliothèque Nationale lat. 3638A
- Paris, Bibliothèque Nationale lat. 14429
- Valenciennes, Bibliothèque Municipale MS 101

The "Transitional" group, appearing from the 12th to 14th century, incorporate material from other sources used by second family bestiaries:

- Northumberland Bestiary (Alnwick Castle, MS 447)
- Cambridge, Trinity College R.14.9
- Leningrad, Rossiiskaia natsional'naia biblioteka Q.v.V,1
- London, British Library Royal MS 2.B.vii
- London, British Library Royal MS 12.C.xix
- Munich, Bayerische Staatsbibliothek gall. 16
- New York, Morgan Library M. 81

=== Second family ===
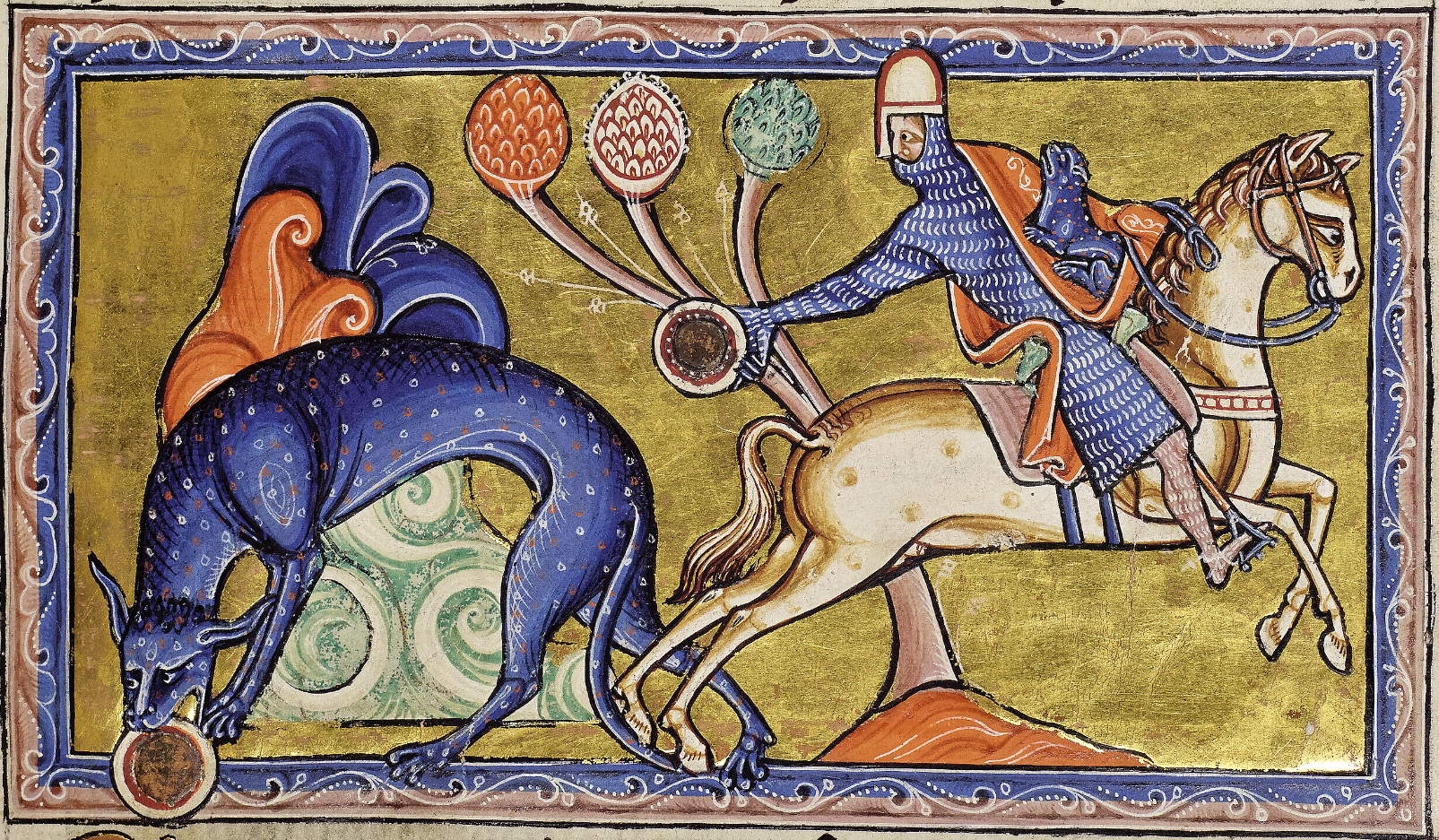
Detail of folio 8 recto from the Aberdeen Bestiary, the tiger

The works in this group are based principally on Isidore's Etymologiæ with significant additional material from Solinus, Saint Ambrose's Hexameron, Rabanus Maurus and others:

- Aberdeen Bestiary (Aberdeen University Library MS 24)
- Brussels, Bibliothèque Royale 8340
- Brussels, Bibliothèque Royale Hs 8827-42
- Cambridge, Corpus Christi College MS 53
- Cambridge, Fitzwilliam Museum MS 379 (C, W(B))
- Cambridge, Gonville and Caius College MS 109/178
- Cambridge, Gonville and Caius College MS 372/621
- Cambridge, Gonville and Caius College MS 384/604
- Cambridge, University Library Ii.4.26McCulloch|1960
- Canterbury, Cathedral Library Lit.D.10
- Chartres, Bibliothèque Municipale 63 (125)
- Copenhagen, Kongelige Bibliotek Gl. Kgl. 1633 4°
- Douai, Bibliothèque Municipale MS 711
- Le Mans, Bibliothèque Municipale 84
- London, British Library Add MS 11283
- London, British Library Harley MS 3244 (ff. 36r-71v)
- London, British Library Harley MS 4751
- Rochester Bestiary (London, British Library Royal MS 12.F.xiii)
- London, British Library Sloane MS 3544
- Los Angeles, Getty Museum, Salvatorberg Bestiary
- Nîmes, Bibliothèque Municipale 82
- New York, Morgan Library MS M. 890
- Oxford, Bodleian Library MS. Ashmole 1511
- Oxford, Bodleian Library MS. Bodley 533
- Oxford, Bodleian Library MS. Bodley 764
- Oxford, Bodleian Library MS. Douce 88 A
- Oxford, Bodleian Library MS. Douce 151
- Oxford, St. John's College MS. 61
- Oxford, St. John's College MS. 178
- Oxford, University College MS. 120
- Paris, Bibliothèque Nationale lat. 3630
- Paris, Bibliothèque Nationale lat. 11207
- Paris, Mazarine Library 742 (1115)
- Vatican, Apostolic Library Reg. 258
- Zirc, Országos Széchényi Könyvtár Cod. Lat. 506

=== Third family ===
These, from the 13th century, expand on the above with various races of humans, mythological creatures, and sometimes wonders of the world from Bernard Silvestris and others:

- Cambridge, Fitzwilliam Museum 254
- Cambridge, University Library MS Kk.4.25
- Oxford, Bodleian Library, MS. e Musaeo 136
- Oxford, Bodleian Library MS. Douce 88 E
- Westminster Abbey Library MS 22

=== Fourth family ===
The sole work in this family, from the 15th century, is distinguished by its incorporation of writings by Bartholomaeus Anglicus:

- Cambridge, University Library MS. Gg.6.5

=== Dicta Chrysostomi ===
These works were attributed in their time to John Chrysostom and appeared, mostly in Germany, from the 12th to 15th century:

- Bad Windsheim, Ratsbibl. Cod. 28
- Brussels, Bibliothèque Royale 18421-29
- Chicago, Newberry Library MS 31.1
- Epinal, Bibliothèque Municipale 58 (209)
- Göttweig, Stiftsbibl. Cod. Ms. 154
- Göttweig, Stiftsbibl. Cod. ms. 200
- Harvard University, Houghton Library MS Typ 101
- Leningrad, Gos. Publ. Biblioteka Saltykova-Shchedrina lat. Q.v.III,1
- Leipzig, Universitätsbibl. Paul. fol. 351
- Leipzig, Universitätsbibl. Paul. 4° 1305
- Linz, Studienbibl. Cod. ms. Cc.II.15
- London, British Library Sloane MS 278
- Munich, Bayerische Staatsbibliothek clm 536
- Munich, Bayerische Staatsbibliothek clm 2655
- Munich, Bayerische Staatsbibliothek clm 3221
- Munich, Bayerische Staatsbibliothek clm 5613
- Munich, Bayerische Staatsbibliothek clm 5921
- Munich, Bayerische Staatsbibliothek clm 6908
- Munich, Bayerische Staatsbibliothek clm 9600
- Munich, Bayerische Staatsbibliothek clm 14216
- Munich, Bayerische Staatsbibliothek clm 14348
- Munich, Bayerische Staatsbibliothek clm 14693
- Munich, Bayerische Staatsbibliothek clm 16189
- Munich, Bayerische Staatsbibliothek clm 19648
- Munich, Bayerische Staatsbibliothek clm 23787
- New York, Morgan Library MS M. 832
- Paris, Bibliothèque de l’Arsenal lat. 394
- Paris, Bibliothèque Nationale lat. 10448
- Uppsala, Universitetsbibliotek C 145
- Vienna, Osterreichische Nationalbibliothek 303
- Vienna, Osterreichische Nationalbibliothek 1010
- Vienna, Osterreichische Nationalbibliothek 2511
- Vienna, Osterreichische Nationalbibliothek 4609
- Vienna, Osterreichische Nationalbibliothek 13378
- Wolfenbüttel, Herzog August Bibliothek 35a Helmst. (Manuscript digitized)

=== Single Author manuscripts ===
Many manuscripts contain portions of bestiaries that can be attributed to a single author. These include works by Isidore of Seville's Etymologiae, Thomas de Cantimpré's Liber de Natura Rerum, and Hugues de Fouilloy's De avibus

==== Hugues de Fouilloy ====
- Munich, Bayerische Staatsbibliothek, Clm 9649 (Hugues de Fouilloy, De avibus in a miscellany)

==== Isidore of Seville ====
- Philadelphia, University of Pennsylvania, Kislak Center for Special Collections, Rare Books and Manuscripts, LJS 184 (Isidore of Seville, Etymologiae)

==== Thomas de Cantimpré ====
- Philadelphia, University of Pennsylvania, Kislak Center for Special Collections, Rare Books and Manuscripts, LJS 23 (Thomas de Cantimpré, Liber de Natura Rerum)
- Brugge, Openbare Bibliotheek, Ms. 410 (XIII)
- Brugge, Openbare Bibliotheek, Ms. 411 (XV)
- Brugge, Openbare Bibliotheek, Ms. 412 (XIV)
- Brugge, Openbare Bibliotheek, Ms. 413 (XIV)
- Wrocław, Biblioteka Uniwersytecka, Ms. R 174 (XV)

== French bestiaries ==
The French bestiaries are all derived from works with commonly attributed authorship, and are divided as such:

=== Bestiaire in Verse by Philippe de Thaon ===
- Copenhagen, Kongelige Bibliotek Gl. kgl. S. 3466 8º
- London, British Library Cotton MS Nero A.v
- Oxford, Merton College MS. 249

=== Bestiaire of Gervaise ===
- London, British Library Add MS 28260

=== Bestiaire of Guillaume le Clerc ===
- Cambridge, Fitzwilliam McLean 123
- Cambridge, Fitzwilliam Mus. J.20
- Cambridge, Trinity College O.2.14
- London, British Library Cotton Vespasian A.vii
- London, British Library Egerton MS 613
- London, British Library Royal MS 16.E.viii
- Lyon, Palais des Arts 78
- Oxford, Bodleian Library MS. Bodley 912
- Oxford, Bodleian Library MS. Douce 132
- Paris, Bibliothèque de l'Arsenal 2691
- Paris, Bibliothèque Nationale fr. 902
- Paris, Bibliothèque Nationale fr. 1444
- Paris, Bibliothèque Nationale fr. 2168
- Paris, Bibliothèque Nationale fr. 14964
- Paris, Bibliothèque Nationale fr. 14969
- Paris, Bibliothèque Nationale fr. 14970
- Paris, Bibliothèque Nationale fr. 20046
- Paris, Bibliothèque Nationale fr. 24428
- Paris, Bibliothèque Nationale fr. 25406
- Paris, Bibliothèque Nationale fr. 25408
- Paris, Bibliothèque Nationale Rothschild IV.2.24
- New Haven, Beinecke Library MS 395 (formerly Phillipps 4156)
- Vatican, Apostolic Library Regina 1682
- In a Psalter, the Queen Mary Psalter, British Library Royal MS 2B, vii
- In a psalter, the Isabelle Psalter, State Library, Munich

=== Bestiaire of Pierre de Beauvais ===
- Malines, Bibliothèque du Séminaire 32
- Montpellier, Bibliothèque de la Faculté de Médecine H.437
- Paris, Bibliothèque de l'Arsenal fr. 3516
- Paris, Bibliothèque Nationale fr. 834
- Paris, Bibliothèque Nationale fr. 944
- Paris, Bibliothèque Nationale nouv. acq. 13251
- ex-Phillipps 6739 [C, M]
- Vatican, Apostolic Library Reg. 1323

== Middle English bestiary ==
- London, British Library Arundel MS 292

== Italian bestiaries ==
- Florence, Bibl. Laurenziana Cod. plut. LXXXX Inf. Cod. 47 (Bibl. Gadd.)
- Florence, Bibl. Laurenziana Cod. Ashb. 649
- Florence, Bibl. Naz. Cod. Magliabecchiano II.8.33
- Florence, Bibl. Naz. cl. XII Cod. Strozz. Magliabecchiano 135
- Florence, Biblioteca Ricardiana Cod. 1357 P.III.4
- Florence, Biblioteca Ricardiana Cod. 2183 R.IV 4 Nr. 2260
- Florence, Biblioteca Ricardiana Cod. 2281
- Naples, Bibl. Naz. XII.E.11
- Padova, Museo Civico di Padova (Bibl. Comun.) Cod. C.R.M.248
- Paris, Bibliothèque Nationale ital. 450
- Rome, Bibl. Corsini 44.G.27

== Catalan bestiaries ==
- Barcelona, Bibl. Universitària 75
- Barcelona, Bibl. de Catalunya 87
- Barcelona, Bibl. de Catalunya 310
- Vic, Bibl. Capitular 229
- Vic, Bibl. Capitular 1354

== Icelandic bestiary ==
- Copenhagen, Arnamagnæanske Institut, Arnamagnæanske Institut, AM 673a 4º

== German bestiary ==
- Munich, Bayerische Staatsbibliothek, Cgm 38 (Konrad von Megenberg, Das Buch der Natur)
- Munich, Bayerische Staatsbibliothek, Cgm 8414 (Konrad von Megenberg, Das Buch der Natur)
