= Tickhill Psalter =

14th-century English Gothic illuminated manuscript

- New York Public Library
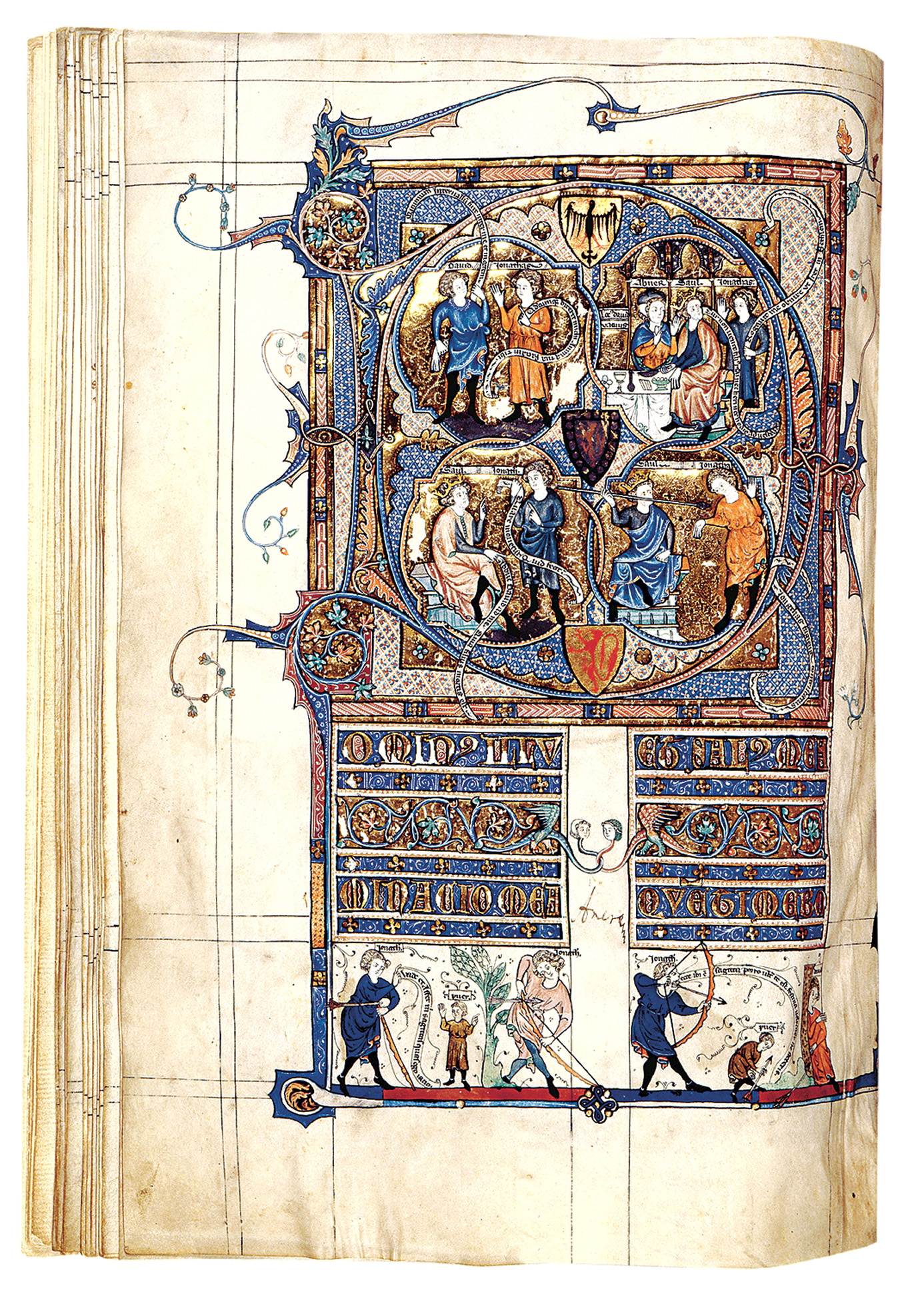
- Psalm 26 of the Tickhill Psalter, showing scenes from 1 Samuel 20
- Type: Illuminated manuscript
- Date: circa 1310
- Place of origin: Tickhill, South Yorkshire, United Kingdom
- Language: Latin
- Scribe: John de Tickhill
- Author: Peter Lombard
- Illuminated by: John de Tickhill
- Material: Parchment, Vellum
- Size: 32.7 x 22.1 cm.
- Format: Double Columns
- Script: Unical
- Previously kept: Worksop Priory, Lothian Library

The Tickhill Psalter is a fourteenth-century English Gothic illuminated manuscript. The psalter is an intricately illustrated but unfinished book meant for use in Augustinian worship. It is decorated with various biblical scenes, many from the life of King David, and is now kept in the New York Public Library.

This Psalter contains three sections, each written and illuminated in various stages of completion. The sections are divided into a preface by Peter Lombard, the Psalms, and the Twelve Canticles including the Litany of Saints and the Nine Collects.

== History ==
Created in circa 1310, the manuscript was originally part of the library of the Worksop Priory in Nottinghamshire, but is now kept in the New York Public Library. The name most likely derives from the fact that it was produced by the Worksop prior John de Tickhill, who likely came from the nearby South Yorkshire town of Tickhill.

The Psalter is sometimes referred to as the Tikyll Psalter or Tickytt Psalter, due to a spelling issue on the title bindings that were redone under the Library of Lothian.

This Psalter is unique because the chief illuminator/ scribe's name and area of origin for the manuscript is known, unlike most other English Gothic illuminations, because of an Inscription written on the first folio.

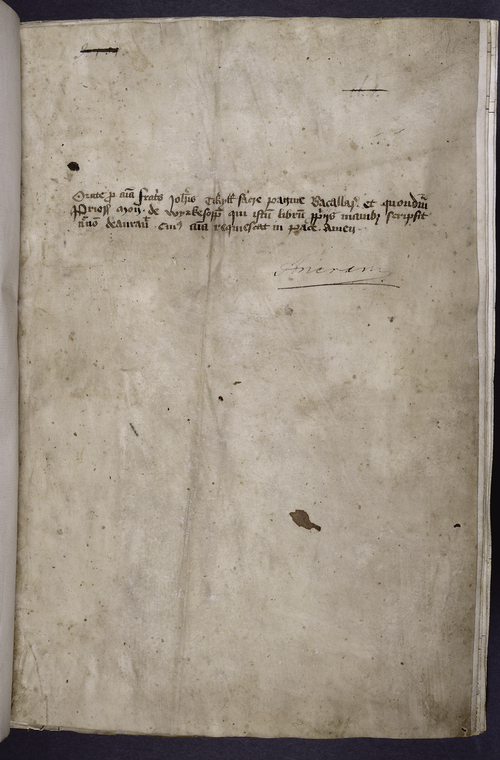
Foreword describing John Tickhill's involvement in creating the following manuscript written in Latin during the fifteenth century

- Latin: "Orate pro anima fratris Johannis Tikyll sacre pagine Bacallarii et quondam prioris monasterii de Wyrkesopp qui istum librum propriis manibus scripsit necnon deauravit, cuius anima requiescat in pace. Amen"
  - Translation: Pray for the soul of Brother John Tickhill, Bachelor of Divinity and former Prior of the monastery of Worksop, who wrote this book with his own hands and also gilded it. May his soul rest in peace. Amen.

This inscription identifies the author and artist as John Tickhill, the Prior of the Augustinian monastery of Worksop, nine miles from the village of Tickhill. He was instated as Prior in November 1303, and was removed from office on 6 March 1314 for financial misconduct, due in part to the costs associated with producing a script of this level, leaving the manuscript unfinished in different stages. This gives a unique insight into the production processes of these intricate 14th century manuscripts.

=== Provenance ===
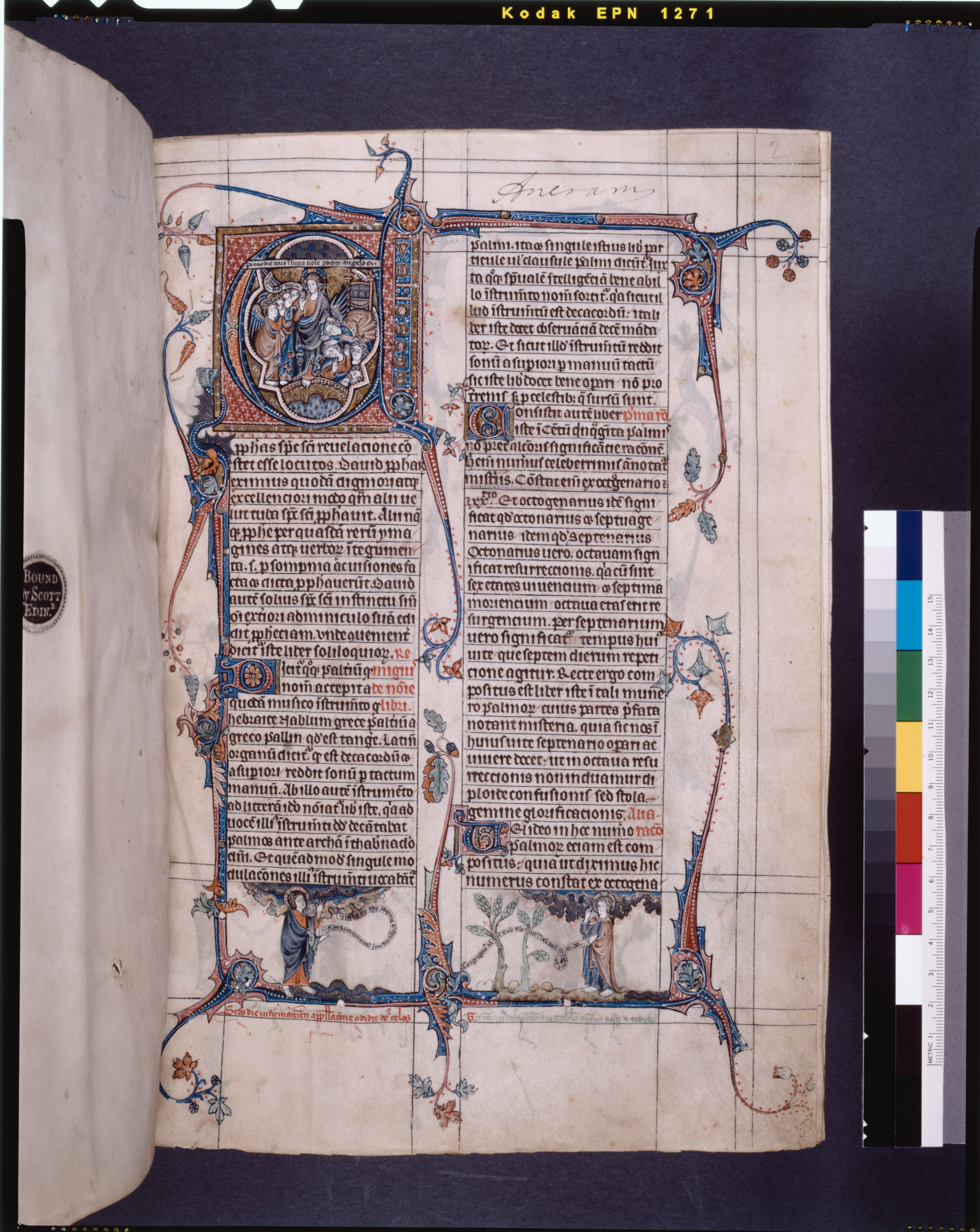
Signature of William Kerr, "Ancram" in the top right corner of the folio containing the foreword to the Psalms, originally written in the "Commentarium in Psalmos"

It is uncertain when the Tickhill Psalter was acquired by the Kerr family, also known by the title Marquesses of Lothian, but the Psalter began appearing in records around the sixteenth century. Two bookplates were installed in the Psalter, one in the eighteenth century and one in the nineteenth century. Twenty of the pages were written on by owner William Kerr, 6th Marquess of Lothian, his signature reading Ancram. During the eighteenth century, the Psalter was rebound by Scott of Edinburgh, who rebound many of the books in the Lothian Library. While being rebound, the margins had been cut down to 12 7/8 in (330 mm) and 8 5/8 in (220 mm).

It was bought by the New York Public Library at an auction of rare books and manuscripts from the library of Philip Kerr, 11th Marquess of Lothian on 27 January 1932, purchased by A. S. W. Rosenbach. The manuscript was exhibited once by the New York Public Library before rebinding and conservation efforts took place. In 2016, twenty pages of the Tickhill Psalter were digitized and made publicly available through their online collections. The Psalter is a part of the Spencer Collection under the title "Psalterium".

=== Creation and dating ===
The decoration of the psalter was started sometime after Tickhill became Priory in 1304, and before his removal from the position in 1314. It is difficult to determine the exact time or date this manuscript was created, but there are some clues that give an approximate time frame. John de Tickhill first came into power at the Worksop Priory during the year 1303, which is when he would have been able to start production on this manuscript.

There are around twenty-eight known completed heraldic shields of actual feudal families depicted in the marginal decorations throughout the Psalter. Because the personal shield of a person who had already died would not be depicted on the pages where heraldry symbolism is used in decoration, the Psalter is likely to have been produced before 1312 given Folio 51 depicts the shields of John de Hastings, the Lord of Bergavenny who died in 1312 and of the de Clare family, which became extinct in 1314. Folio 64 contains the shield of Theobald de Verdon, who died in 1314. There are many examples of heraldry on another page, 1.IV, but this page shows signs that it has been tampered with, so identification cannot be certain.

John Tickhill was removed from office during the year 1314 after a visit from the archdeaconry of Nottingham, he was cited with "Incontinence and Dilapidation", for an improper use of funds and allowing the monastery to fall into a state of disrepair. Less than a month later, Robert de Carlton was elected into the Priory seat by the other Canons at Worksop, and work on the Psalter was halted as funds were redirected.

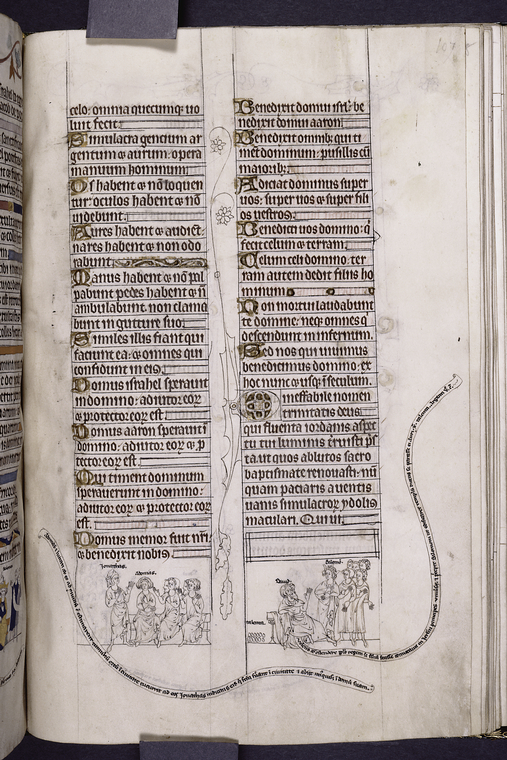
Unfinished line drawing, without color, illustration on quire 14, (ff. 107-114v). Example of the underdrawings usually underneath paint.

== Physical qualities and dimensions ==
The Tickhill Psalter has nineteen quires total, which are folded into eight folio's each. Each folio contains two columns of text per page, with space for thirty lines of text per page. The manuscript is made of vellum, except for the eight folios of parchment surrounding the manuscript, added at a later date.

== Content and unusual features ==
=== Calendar ===
The Psalter is also unique because it lacks any trace of a liturgical calendar. Psalters were often considered incomplete without a calendar, and it is believed there might have been one included loosely in the pages. This is odd of such an elaborately planned manuscript to not include a space for a Calendar to be bound into the book, and there is no blank space for it to be added later, bound in or written in the margins, either.

=== Tree of Jesse ===
This Psalter features a full page illuminated scene of the Tree of Jesse. Of the various genealogical forms a Tree of Jesse commonly takes throughout history, this depiction is considered to be in Ascending form, because the iconographic bubbles are attached to a stem coming from the loins of the dreaming Jesse. There are many biblical figures included in the family tree including David with his harp, a Madonna and Child, God, and the Holy Spirit.

The folio directly to the right of the Tree of Jesse contains the Beatus vir, a stylized initial containing the first few words to The Psalms, as well as continued scenes from the life of David.

=== Psalms ===
The psalms in the Psalter account for most of the fully complete blocks of text and illuminations.

The Psalter includes a preface to the psalms, taken from the Commentarium in Psalmos of Peter Lombard. There is more short commentary before each of the actual psalm readings that uses the translation known as Psalterium Gallicanum written by St. Jerome of Bethlehem in 392. The Preface is accompanied by marginal drawings depicting scenes from Genesis.

After the Tree of Jesse, the psalms are then divided into eight parts, with seven full page initial between each section. The initials contain scenes from the life of David, the rest chronologically depicted through marginal drawings throughout the psalms.

While it is common for English Gothic manuscripts to include scenes from the Books of Samuel, there are usually more variety in choices of biblical scenes. The Psalter is unique in how it focuses on the life of King David and Solomon.

This Eight-part division of the psalms is connected to the Roman and Gallican customs during the time of St Augustine of Canterbury, as there are designated reading for each of the seven days of the week, with an additional Sunday Vesper.

=== Canticles ===
Source of the commentary preceding the canticles is unknown. There are twelve total canticles. The Canticles shows a somewhat incomplete text, there are a few missing pre-canticle prayers with space for them still blank, starting around the eighth canticle. The spaces for post-canticle commentaries after are also left blank after canticle nine.

=== Litany of Saints ===
Invokes the names of St. Augustine and St. Cuthbert, the Patron Saint of Worksop, alongside Mary the Virgin. Saint Peter is also mentioned as a Patron of York Minster who oversaw the Worksop Priory. Following the Litany of Saints is the nine Collects, written on folio's 152 and 153. Following the Collects are three columns of measured and lined empty space.

== See also ==
- List of illuminated manuscripts
