= Worksop Priory =

Church in Nottinghamshire, England

- The Priory Church of Our Lady and St Cuthbert
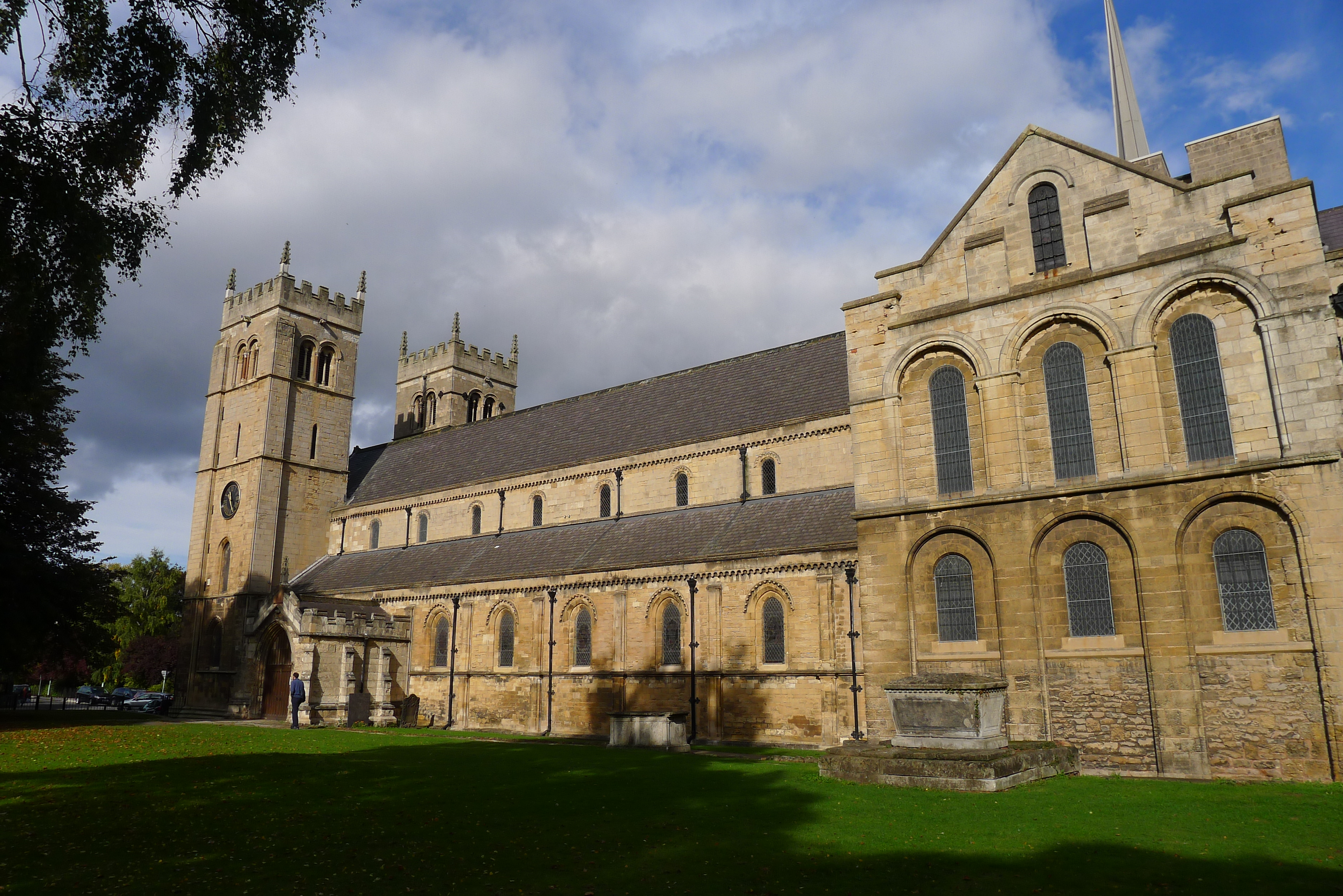
- The priory from the side
- Worksop Priory
- 53°18′13″N 01°06′56″W
- Denomination: Church of England
- Churchmanship: Anglo Catholic
- Website: worksoppriory.co.uk

History
- Dedication: Our Lady and St. Cuthbert

Administration
- Province: York
- Diocese: Southwell and Nottingham
- Archdeaconry: Newark
- Deanery: Bassetlaw and Bawtry
- Parish: Worksop Priory

Clergy
- Bishop: Rt Revd Stephen Race SSC (AEO)
- Vicar: Fr Nicolas Spicer SSC

Worksop Priory (formally the Priory Church of Our Lady and Saint Cuthbert, Worksop) is a Church of England parish church and former priory in the town of Worksop, Nottinghamshire, part of the Diocese of Southwell and Nottingham and under the episcopal care of the Bishop of Beverley.

The church is Grade I listed by the Department for Culture, Media and Sport as a building of outstanding architectural or historic interest.

== History ==
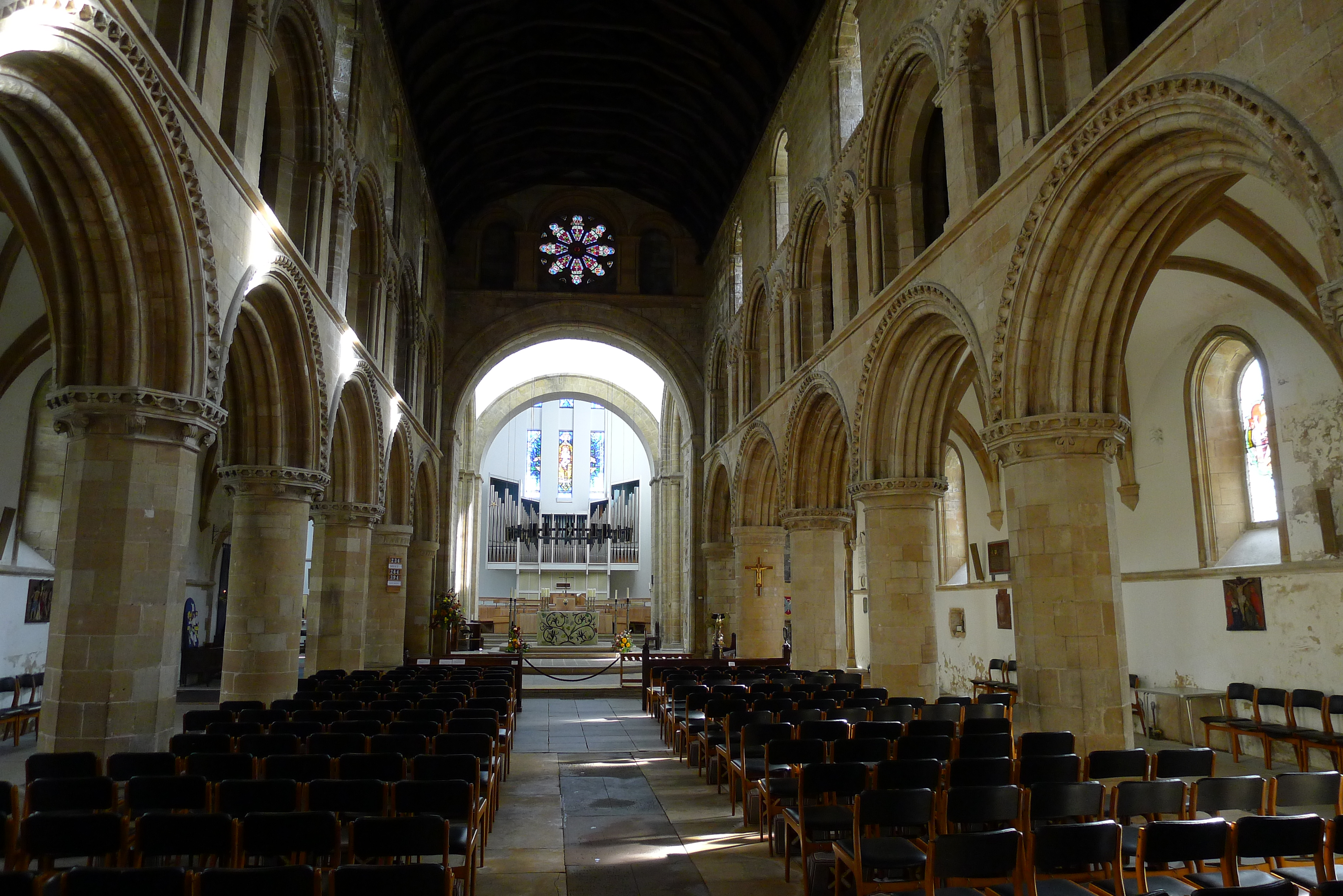
Part of the nave of the Priory Church

The initial land grant and monies to establish the Augustinian priory were made by William de Lovetot in 1103. In 1187 Philip, the Canon of Lincoln Cathedral, donated the Worksop Bestiary, an illuminated manuscript now at the Morgan Library & Museum in New York. During the thirteenth century, two lords of Worksop (Gerard de Furnival II and his son Thomas de Furnival) died while on crusade, Gerard on the Fifth Crusade in 1219 and Thomas on the Barons' Crusade in 1241. Thomas's brother, Gerard III, also died on this campaign, while their brother William, who had also taken part, returned home. A later rhyming history, which was on display in Worksop Priory in the late fifteenth century, claimed that Gerard III survived the Barons' Crusade and returned his brother's body for burial at the priory; however, earlier evidence indicates that this is untrue. In the 14th century the Tickhill Psalter was produced by the prior, John de Tickhill.

The priory was dissolved on the orders of Henry VIII on 15 November 1539. The property was granted to Francis Talbot, 5th Earl of Shrewsbury on condition that the Earl should provide a glove for the right hand of the sovereign at the coronation. This tradition continues to this day. Over time most of the former monastic buildings were plundered for their stone, but the nave of the church was saved for use as a parish church, and the early 14th-century gatehouse was used as a school.

Having been found to be in a state of severe structural decay, the Priory was restored between 1845 and 1849 by the local architect Richard Nicholson. Nicholson's interventions appear to have used Southwell Minster as its model rather than any strict documentary evidence for the church's medieval appearance.

The lady chapel was restored between 1920 and 1922 by the architect Harold Brakspear. It had stood in a ruined state since the dissolution of the Priory in the 16th century, completely detached from the church to the south east. While the plan to restore it had originated prior to the First World War, when it was rededicated in 1922 it was done so in memory of the parishioners who had lost their lives in the conflict.

The restoration of the Lady Chapel was the first part of an ambitious plan to restore Worksop Priory to a scale approaching its pre-reformation appearance. The scheme, entirely devised by Brakspear, envisaged a new transept, crossing tower and choir. The south transept was the first part of the plan to be realised, completed in 1929. It was followed by the north transept in 1935, which was finished by Brakspear's son Oswald after his father's death in 1934. As funds were not then available to complete the envisaged tower and choir, a temporary lantern was erected over the crossing, which allowed for the unblocking of the wall at the east end of the church in order to connect the existing building with the new transept.

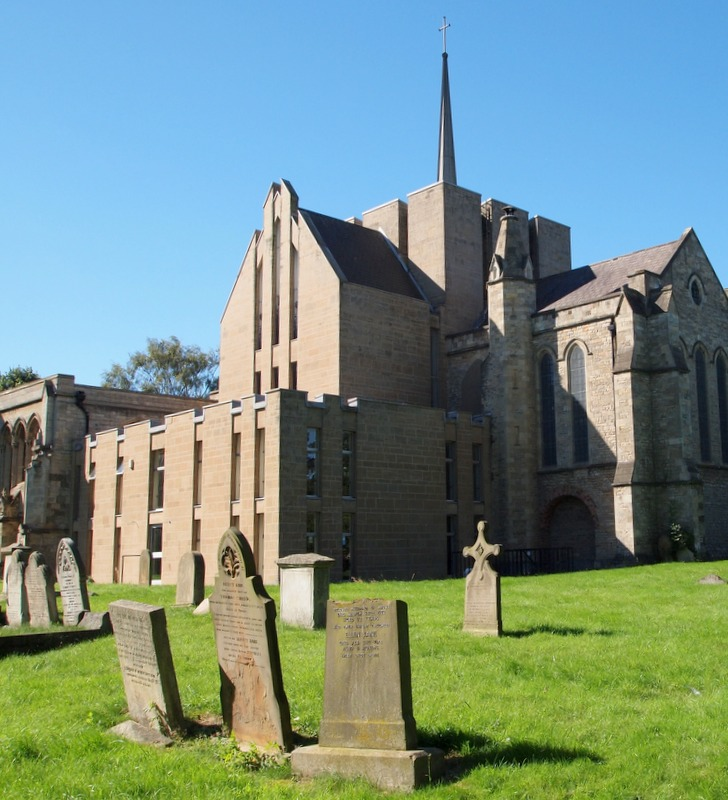
Laurence King's tower and eastern extension

It was only in 1965 that, thanks to a bequest, funds became available to compete the expansion project. However, by this time, taste for the Gothic Revival had diminished, as had the need - and the funds - for a choir on the scale envisaged by Brakspear. Instead, the architect Lawrence King was engaged around 1966 to provide designs for a modern tower and choir. It was a commission not dissimilar to that which King was undertaking at Blackburn Cathedral and his solution shared some overt similarities. Built between 1970 and 1974, the squat crossing tower is topped by an aluminium flèche, below which King placed the sanctuary, equipped with a modern stone altar table and steel and brass hanging corona. The short gabled area behind hosts the choir stalls and organ, with an east window glazed by King's regular collaborator, John Hayward. King's plan also included new vestries and meeting rooms.

In mid-2017 a face was uncovered, carved into one of the Priory walls, during renovation works. The face was estimated to date back to the year 980 AD, but the wall was finished around 1260 AD.

== Repairs and restorations ==
- 1760 A western gallery was erected across the nave.
- 1784 A gallery was erected along the north side.
- 1845–49 A restoration by R. Nicholson of Lincoln. The church was re-roofed, new foundations were provided to the south tower and the pillars and south aisle were pulled back to vertical.
- 1879 New organ by Brindley & Foster of Sheffield.
- 1883 Repairs to the south tower. Two bells added increasing the ring from six to eight.
- 1912 Gatehouse restored.
- 1922 Lady chapel restored by Thomas Pepper and re-dedicated.
- 1929 Opening up of the south transept.
- 1932 Building of the north transept and turret to the central tower.
- 1935 Blocking walls at the end of the nave were removed, creating a single space between the nave and transepts.
- 1966-74 Choir built by Laurence King. New organ by Peter Collins.
- 2023–2025 Repairs to the Gatehouse, largely funded by a £263,540 Historic England grant; in 2026 it was removed from the Heritage at Risk Register, where it had been listed since 1998, and returned to community use.

== Burials ==
- William de Lovetot
- John Talbot, 3rd Earl of Shrewsbury (in the Lady chapel)
- William Edgar Allen owner of Edgar Allen & Company steelworks

== Previous clergy ==
=== Priors of Worksop ===
- William 1180
- Stephen 1196
- Henry 1200
- Walter de Leirton 1233
- Robert de Pikeborn 1253
- John 1260
- Alan de London 1279
- John de Tikehill 1303
- Robert de Carlton 1313
- Johannes 1396
- Roger de Upton
- John de Laughton 1404
- Carolus de Flemyng 1457
- William Acworth 1463
- Robert Warde 1485
- Robert or Thomas Gateford 1518
- Nicholas Storth 1522
- Thomas Stokes 1535

=== Vicars of Worksop ===
- Alanus de London 1276
- Canon Adam de Roderham 1300
- Robert de Beverlac 1324
- William de Hanay 1328
- Richard de Trent 1358
- Thomas Barneby 1405
- Walter Burne
- John Howe 1450
- John Emlay 1452
- Walter Burne
- Thomas Ingill 1472
- Prebendary Thomas Scott 1486
- Canon John Johnson 1519
- Thomas Howard 1535
- John Thornley 1544
- John Goodriche 1577
- Richard Barnard 1601
- Canon Oliver Bray 1613
- William Carte MA 1615
- Samuel Smyth BA 1628
- Walter Barnard 1662
- Samuel Buckingham MA 1673
- Thomas Calton 1685
- John Cook 1718
- John Ward 1758
- The Hon. Philip Howard 1778
- Thomas Carter 1783
- Thomas Stayce MA 1792
- James Appleton MA 1847
- Edward Hawley MA 1870
- Thomas Slodden MA 1882
- Canon George Jas. A. d'Arcy 1909
- Jas. George Morton Howard MA 1941
- Canon Ralph H Foster 1955
- Canon Peter H. Boulton BA LLM 1967
- Bernard Holdridge 1986
- Andrew R. Wagstaff BD AKC 1994
- Canon Nicolas Spicer BA 2007

== Organ ==
The painted organ case was designed by Peter Collins, in co-operation with the architects, Laurence King and Partners, and constructed in mahogany in its main parts with pine-cored block wood panels. The case has a tonal as well as an architectural function, mixing the sound of the pipes and projecting it forwards as a blended whole. The specification was drawn up by David Butterworth and is almost identical to that of St Mary's Church, Nottingham.

The pipes, of which there are 1634, are of various materials ranging in tin content from 90% in the façade pipes to 20% for some flute stops. Copper and pine are used for other registers. With the exception of 24 small pipes in the pedal case, all the front pipes are speaking. The reed pipes are by Giesecke of Germany; the flues by Stinkins of Holland and Peter Collins; the cymbelstern is by Laukhuff, also of Germany.

The console at the foot of the central display pipes is constructed of oak; the naturals are of hard 'blackwood' and the accidentals are white resin topped. The manual compass is of 56 notes; the pedal compass of 30 notes.

The style of voicing and the general approach to its construction has origins in the 17th and 18th centuries, rather than the more familiar instrument to be found in England. The balance of stops is in keeping with classical registration and the 'Werk-Prinzip' of the case is designed to project the sound into the priory building.

For the mechanism of the key and pedal action, direct connection by trackers of thin wood are used to the control valves, giving the performer control over the attack and decay of each note. The stop action is electric. There are six pistons to each department and six toe levers for the pedal department. There are also eight general pistons.

The organ was reconstructed in 1996 by Wood of Huddersfield. It was cleaned and regulated and the soundboards were reconstructed. The keys were renewed; Swell Octave 2 ft replaced with new pipework by Stinkens; Cymbelstern added; entire stop action (slider solenoids excepted) was remade with Alan Taylor solid state; sequencer added.

- Great Organ
- Principal 8
- Rohr Flute 8
- Octave 4
- Spitz Flute 4
- Quint 2 2/3
- Wide Octave 2
- Tierce 1 3/5
- Mixture III-V
- Trumpet 8
- Tremulant
- Cymbelstern
- Swell Organ
- Wood Gedact 8
- Spitz Gamba 8
- Principal 4
- Koppel Flute 4
- Octave 2
- Spitz Quint 1 1/3
- Scharf III – V
- Dulzian 16
- Schalmey 8
- Tremulant
- Pedal Organ
- Subbass 16
- Octave 8
- Subbass 8
- Wide Octave 4
- Mixture III
- Sordun 32
- Fagot 16
- Trumpet 8

=== Organists ===
- John Hilton Turvey c. 1840
- George Walker 1854–1861
- Frederick Staton 1861–1879
- Hamilton White c. 1880 (formerly organist at St Swithun's Church, East Retford)
- Revd. J.T. Bingley c. 1887–1891
- Thomas Pickford 1891–1912 (formerly organist of Christ Church, Banbury)
- H.J. Greenfield 1912–1920
- John Newton 1920–1921 (formerly assistant organist of St Edmundsbury Cathedral)
- Stanley H Mayes 1922–1925
- Ellis White 1925–????
- Cecil Victor Berry
- Percy Radford
- David Burnham ca. 1963 ca. 1972
- Anthony Taylor ca. 1979
- Leslie Carrick Smith
- Michael Overbury 1999–2014
- Mark Rothman
- Rosemary Field 2021–present

== Clock ==
The turret clock contains a plate inscribed Hutchinson, Worksop, Fecit 1753. It was restored in 1972 by Graham Love of Worksop. It was restored again and automated in 2013

== Gallery ==
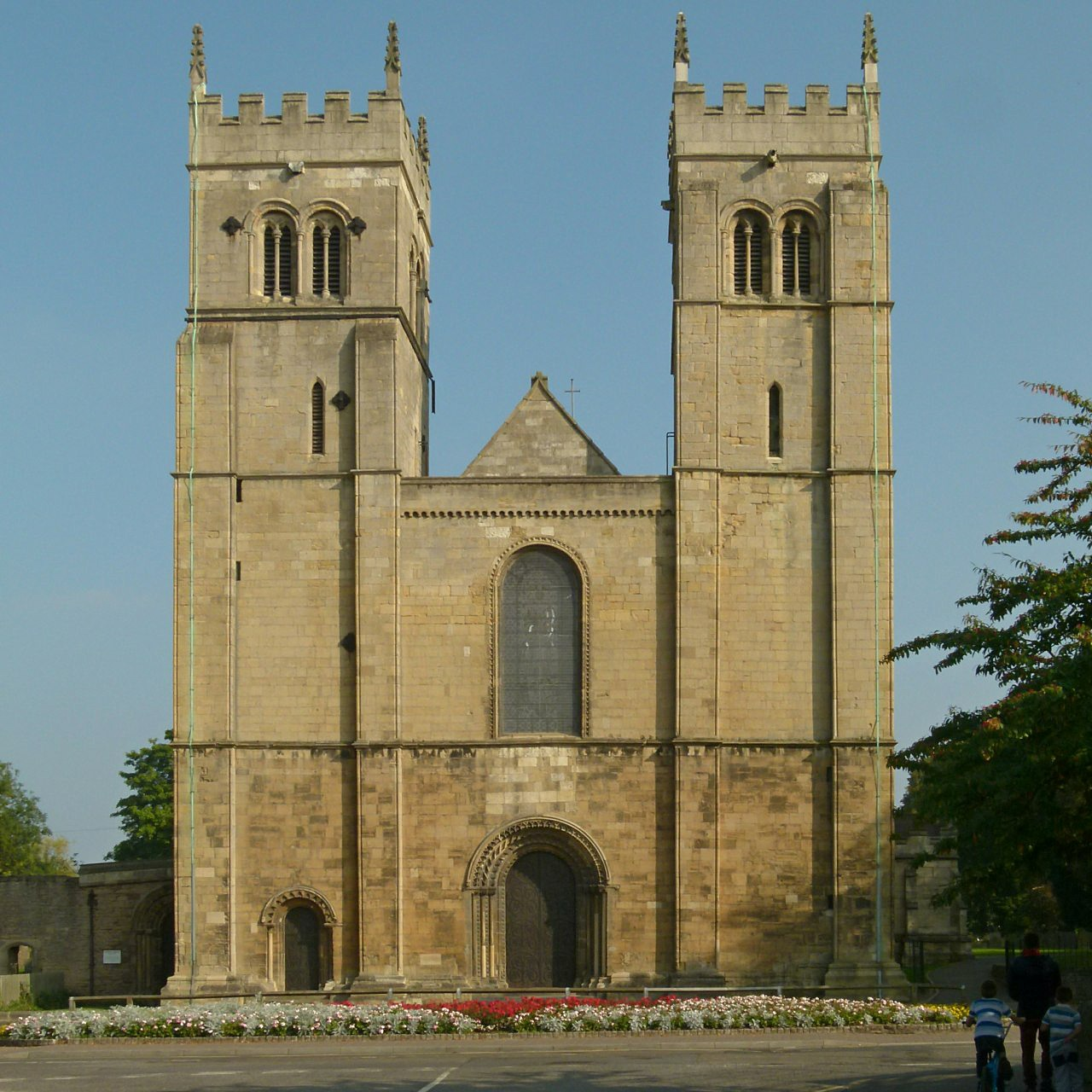
West front

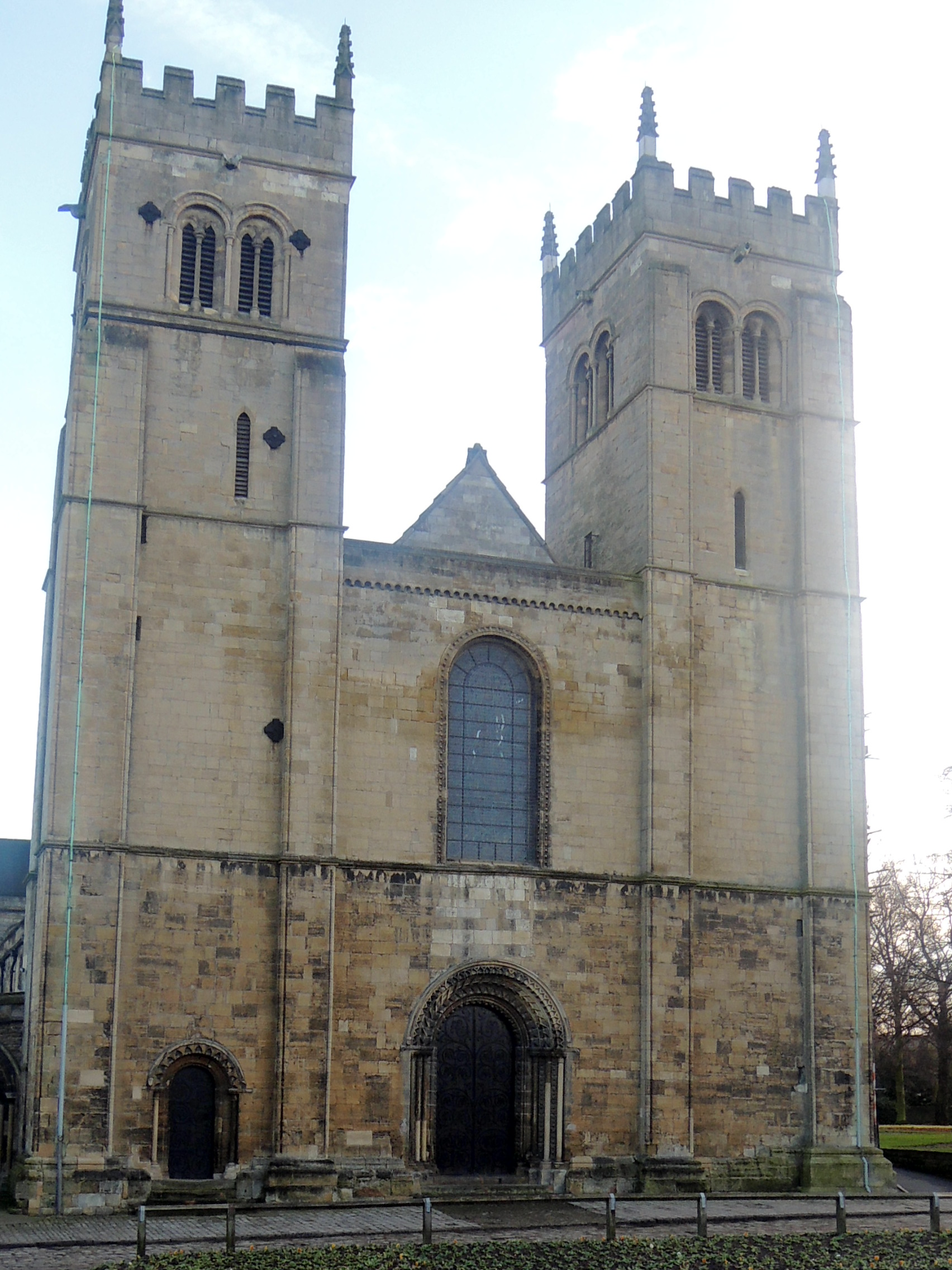
West front - detail

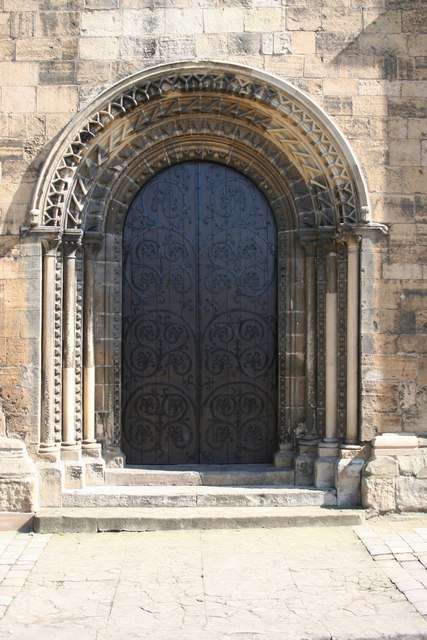
West door

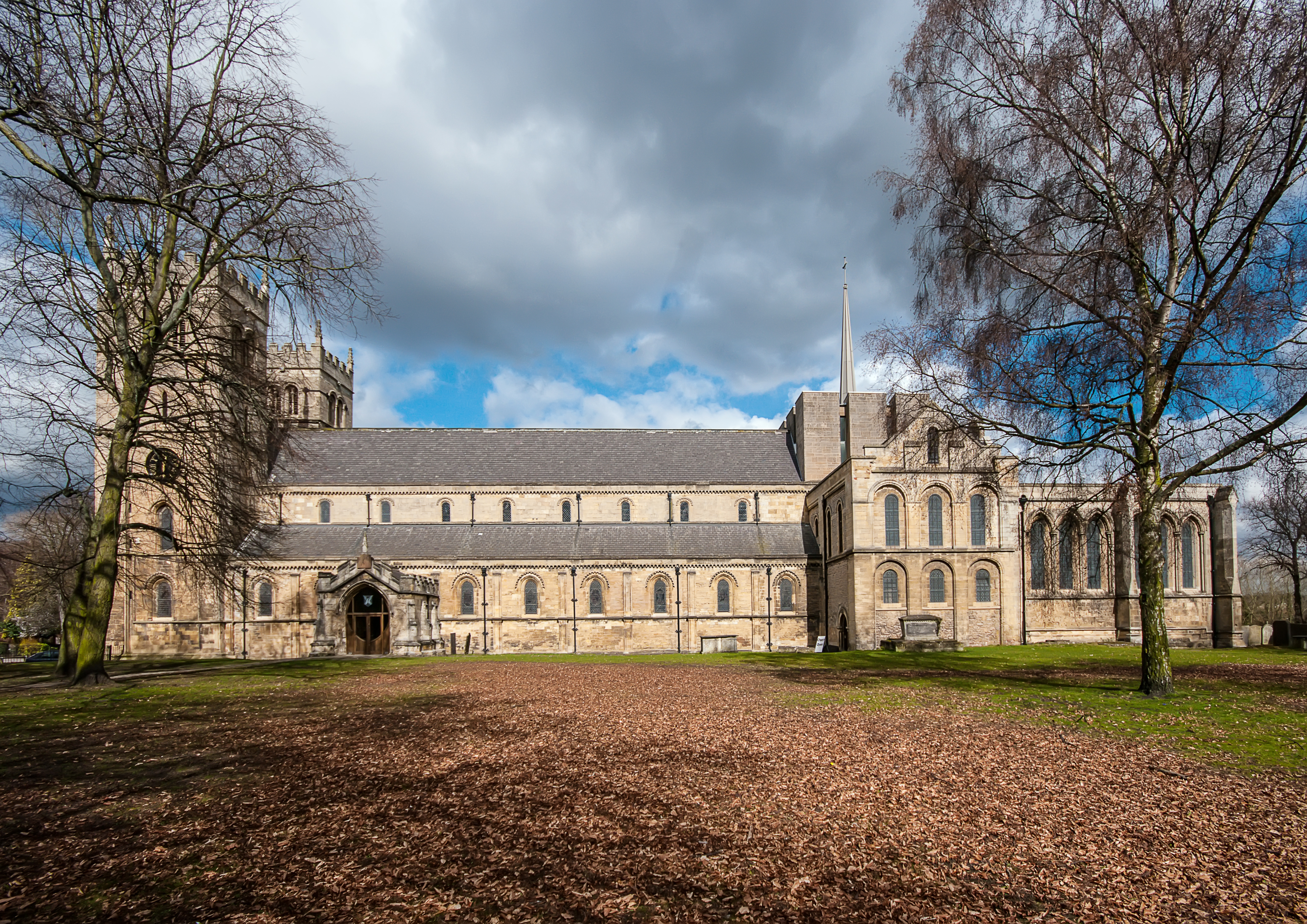
Priory from the south

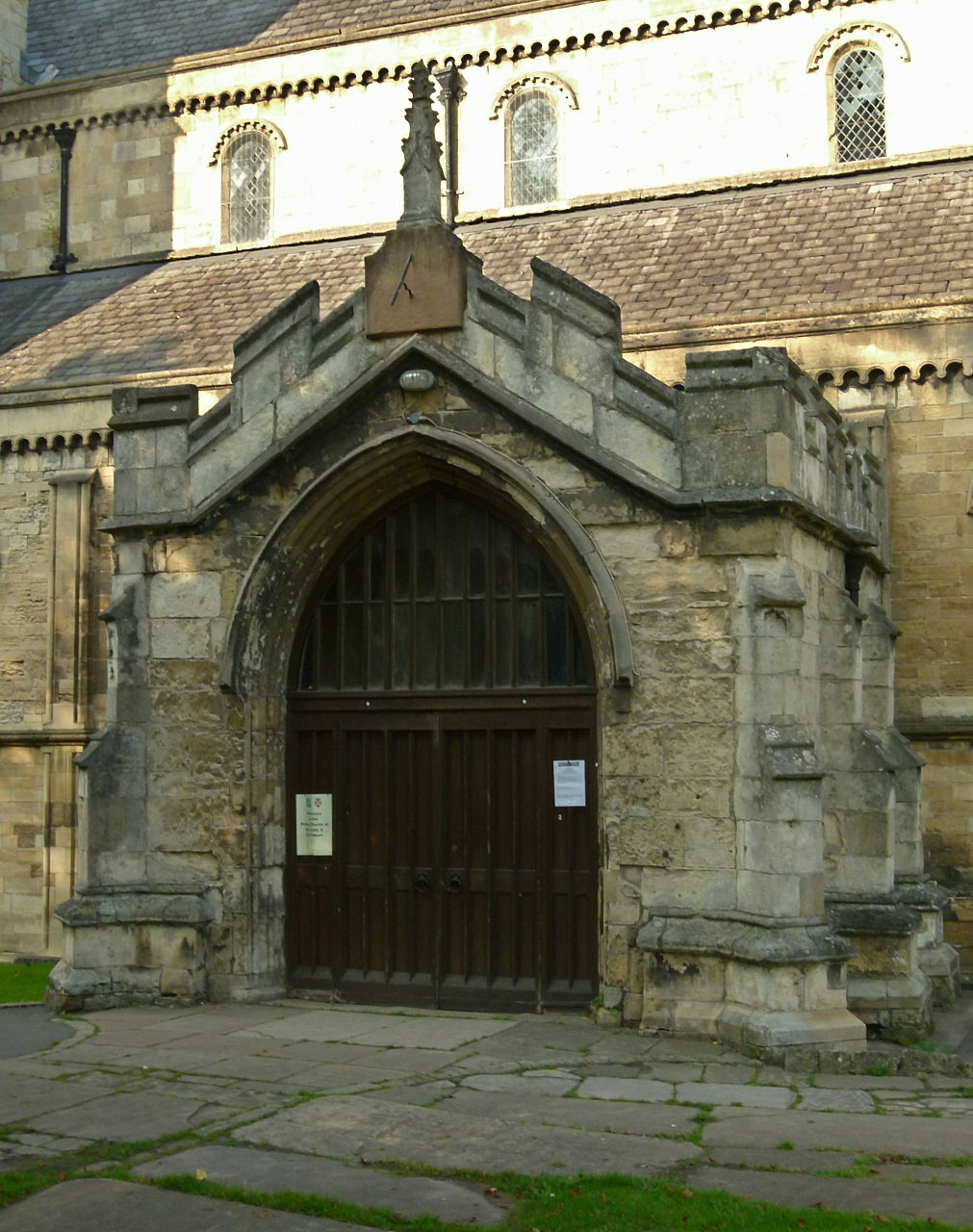
South porch

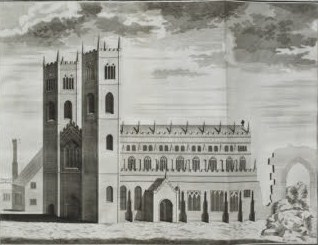
Engraving form John Stevens' The History of the Antient Abbeys, 1723

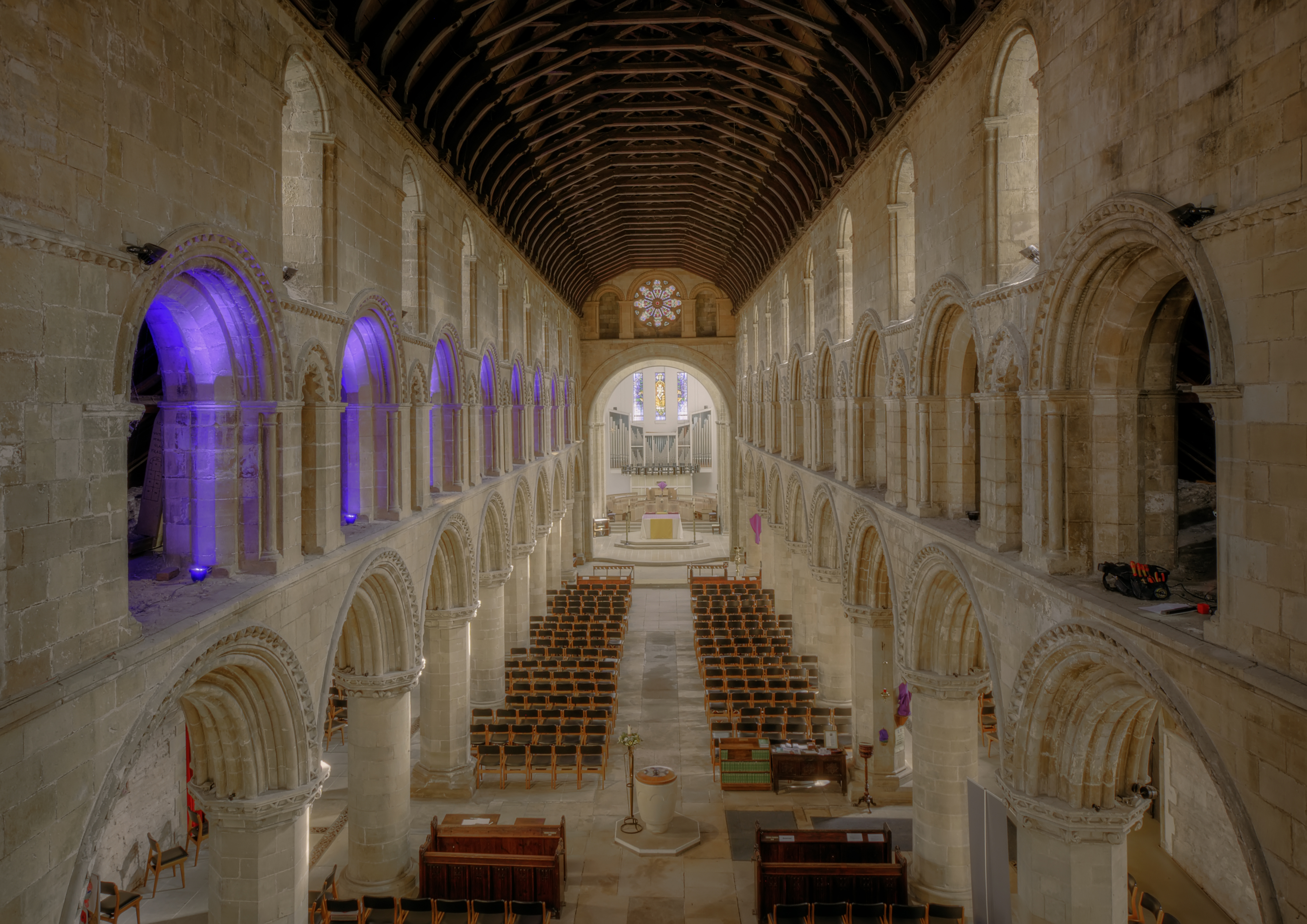
Interior

Arms

== See also ==
- Abbeys and priories in England
- List of English abbeys, priories and friaries serving as parish churches
- Grade I listed buildings in Nottinghamshire
- Listed buildings in Worksop
