= Northumberland Bestiary =

13th c. illuminated manuscript

Adam Names the Animals
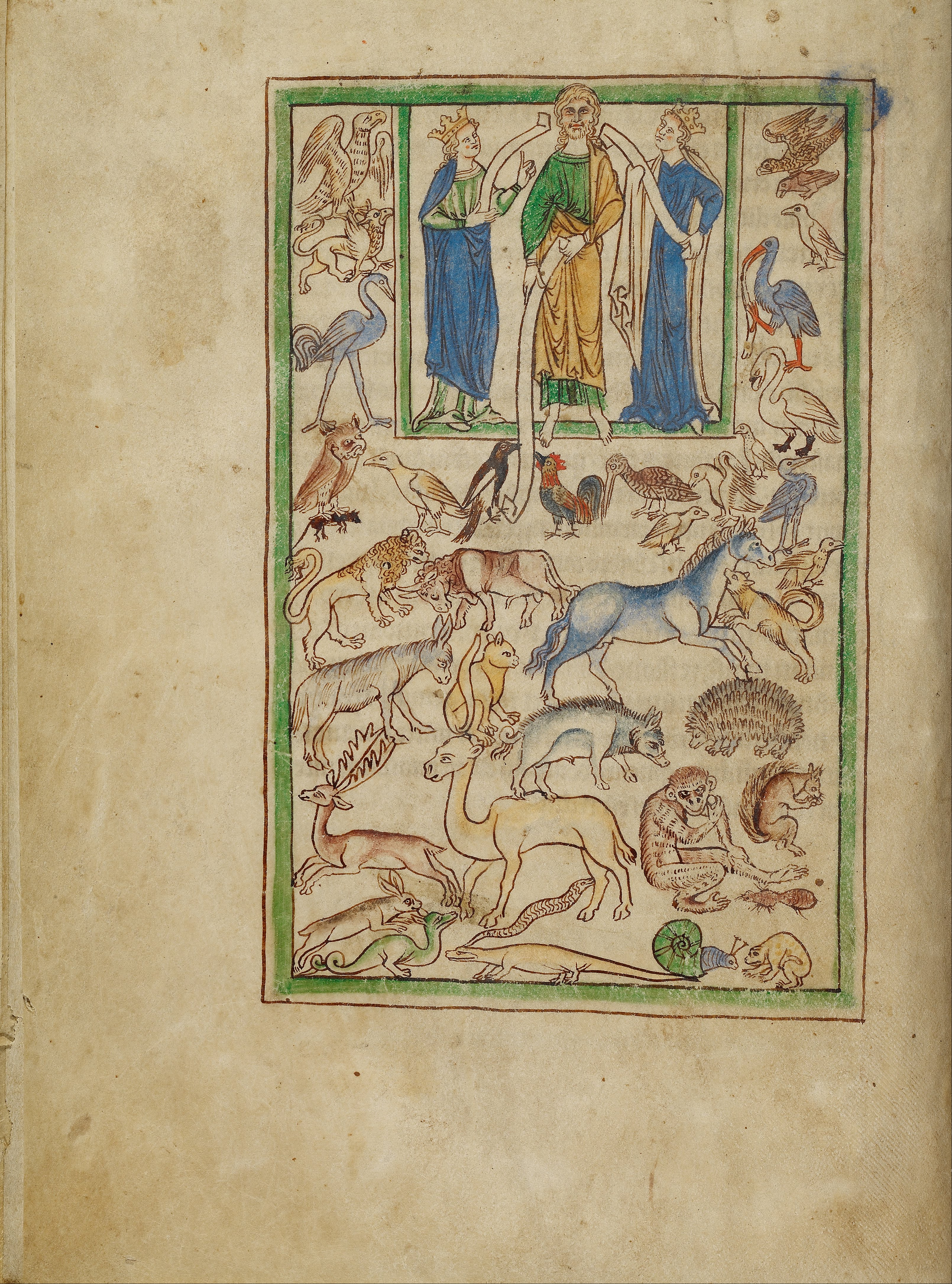
- This image appears in the second chapter of the Northumberland Bestiary on folio six. It depicts a scene in the Bible from book two of Genesis where Adam names the animals.
- Medium: Pen-and-ink. Lined in brown, tinted with body color and translucent washes on parchment
- Dimensions: 20.9804 cm × 15.6972 cm (8.2600 in × 6.1800 in)
- Accession: lido.getty.edu-gm-obj305896

The Northumberland Bestiary (MS 100) is an illuminated manuscript and bestiary dating from 1250-1260. It was originally known as the Alnwick Bestiary (MS 447) as it resided in Alnwick Castle from the eighteenth century until 1990 when it was sold to a private collection. In 2007 it was acquired by the Getty Museum and still resides there today.

Sources for the Northumberland Bestiary include the Greek Physiologus and Hexaemeral literature. Bestiaries traditionally fall into four families however the Northumberland Bestiary is a transitional manuscript which draws upon the first and second families of manuscripts. It is a small Quarto measuring around 21 x 15 cm.

The bestiary contains chapters regarding the creation of man, naming the animals, beasts, birds, fish, serpents, the condition of man, and trees. In modern scholarship, the Northumberland Bestiary and other bestiaries entries on Hyenas has been an area of research for Jewish histories.

== Provenance ==
The provenance of the Northumberland Bestiary is known through a series of personal notes called pen trails found on folio 73v as well as from the flyleaf on f. 74v where the inscription "Grace Fitzjames feres God and loves his word." The pen trails begin in about 1500 and they include a distich warning clergymen to stay away from women, a partial document naming justice of the peace, Robert Turges, and the Percy family seal stamped on folios 1, 20, and 21v. The bestiary could have come to the possession of Turges through the movement of texts between monastic centers, as bribe payments or through exchange, or it could have been acquired as a result of raids carried out on clerics and religious houses by local constables like Turges. Through intermarriage, the manuscript was passed from the Turges family estate through the Horsey, Lewiston, and Fitzjames lines where it was handed down from Grace Fitzjames to her granddaughter Elizabeth Seymour who brought the bestiary to Alnwick Castle in 1776 where it remained until 1990. At the death of Elizabeth Seymour's father in 1750 her husband, Hugh Smithson, adopted the surname Percy and was later created Duke of Northumberland. Thus the bestiary bears the Percy seal. On 27 June 1950 Hugh Percy, 10th Duke of Northumberland, revealed the bestiary to the Roxburghe Club. On 29 November 1990 the NB was sold at Sotheby's for £2.97 million to a private buyer. It was finally acquired by its present owner, the J. Paul Getty Museum, in June 2007.

== Stylistic Family ==
=== Physiologus ===
All bestiaries are inspired by the Greek text the Physiologus as well as various Hexaemeral texts. Latin reproductions of the Physiologus fall into four groups. Version Y had forty-nine chapters and closely follows the original Greek format. It also has biblical references which are taken from the pre vulgate bible. Aside from a couple of chapters which are common to the other groups version Y doesn't seem to influence the others and after the eleventh century appears to have fallen out of reproduction. Version C has twenty-six chapters and is translated very differently from the Greek original with most of its chapters bearing resemblance to Ethiopic writings. This version is important because it is the first illustrated Physiologus. Its miniatures are stylistically influenced by the Utrecht Psalter as well as Alexandrian art. Version A has thirty-six chapters and is distinct by its Carolingian drawings that depict the texts and some allegories made within the text. Finally, Version B had thirty-six or thirty-seven chapters and influenced the most widely distributed manuscripts in France and England during the Middle Ages.

=== Bestiary Families ===
Bestiaries are grouped in to “families” determined by how closely they follow the format of the Physiologus and how many excerpts from other texts are included. The first family of manuscripts are chiefly influenced by Version B of the Physiologus as well as book XII, De animalibus, from The Etymologiae of Isidore of Seville. The first family can further be broken up into sub categories: Version B-Is mostly follows Version B but contains seven chapters directly referencing Isidore. Version H differs from Version B-Is in that it only contains entries for two birds. The second family of manuscripts experiences a stylistic shift from the first family during the twelfth century which phases out the Romanesque influences for a more elaborate Gothic style. It contains almost double the amount of chapters as the first family and follows the classification format employed by Isidore's Book XII. This family includes chapters referencing Hexaemeral text by Ambrose of Milan, Pantheologus by Peter of Cornwall, the Carolingian scholar Hrabanus Maurus, and the anonymous De bestiis et aliis rebus The third family of manuscripts contains even more chapters than the second and pulls from a few extra sources. The first section gives a retelling of an account of distant nations given by Isidore as well as extracts taken from Bernardus Silvestris's Megacosmos or De Mundi Universitate, and the last section includes a passage from John of Salisbury's Policraticus, a section of Seneca's De remediis fortuitorum, the Wheel of Fortune, and the Seven Wonders of the World. The fourth family consists of only one unfinished manuscript.

The NB is considered a transitional bestiary because it falls between the first and second families of Bestiary. Transitional bestiaries generally follow the same order of either the B-Is subcategory or the H subcategory of the first family for the first twenty-four to forty chapters but end with sections formatted after the second family including excerpts from Isadore's Etymologiae which are not seen elsewhere. Transitional bestiaries also include domestic and wild animals such as birds and fish and tigers which are found in the second family of bestiary but not in the first. NB contains some chapters such as the ostrich, unicorn, and fox which are Physiologus based while others such as the mouse come from Isidore. The panther entry begins by combining moralizing text from Physiologus groups B and Y and from De bestiis et aliis rebus. However, the entry ends referencing Isidore and Hrabanus Maurus. In the Book of Beasts there are six couplets from Bernardus Silvestris' Megacosmos on V.23, eight couplets on V.26, and one in the Book of Birds on VI.31.4. This combination of sources is used throughout the manuscript.

== Physical Description ==
The Northumberland Bestiary is a quarto made up of seventy-four vellum leaves. It measures 8 x 6 in. or 21 x 15.7 cm and was bound by Francis Bedford some time between 1853 and 1865 in pasteboard and covered in red morocco leather. It is written in Gothic book hand using brown ink. Flourished majuscules highlighted in alternating red and blue delineate new sections and sentences while initials with flourishes that extend into the margins are used to indicate paragraphs and subsections. There was a possible change in scribe on ff. 63-4. There are a total of 112 pen and ink miniatures within the manuscript which accompany most of the entires and are directly inspired by a 1200–1210 bestiary now in the British Library (Royal MS 12 C XIX) In 106 entries the miniatures appear before the text it represents while in the remaining six entries (incidentally all serpents) the miniatures appear after the text they illustrate. Eighty-eight miniatures are rectangular, eighteen are circular, and 6 are in other shapes. There are 104 miniatures in the Book of Beasts and the remaining eight are found in On the Creation of the World and On Birds. Many of the miniatures are framed and found within the body of the text. In general the subjects of the miniatures are quite naturalistic though the backgrounds are for the most part lacking any landscape or architecture, rendering the subject afloat on a blank vellum background. There are a few instances of marginalia which are similar to the animals shown in the miniatures. All of the miniatures use the tinted line technique where each drawing is lined in brown ink then finished with light color washes and highlights. This technique gives the scribe greater range for detail and allows the viewer to more easily see those details. The miniatures found in the Northumberland Bestiary provide clues to details within the text that the reader may have missed. This helps facilitate active learning.

== Contents ==
The manuscript begins with a chapter entitled "Creation of the World" which references the first two books of Genesis and De imagine Mundi Libri tres by Honorius. This chapter has four entries; The Five Ways of Creation, The Six Ages of Creation, The Six Days of Creation, and Adam and Eve. Next is a chapter on Adam naming the animals, then a chapter expressing the nature and names of birds. The forth chapter contains three sermons; Spiritual Guides and Legates, Medicine for the Soul, and the Journey of Life. Following the first four introductory chapters comes the book of beats, birds, fish, water, serpents, and worms. The final chapters are the Nature of Man, Parts of the Body, the Ages of Man, and Trees. In total the Northumberland Bestiary contains fifty-two animal entries, twenty-nine bird entries (twenty-seven birds, and the bat and bee), thirteen fish entries, eighteen entries on serpents, ten entries on worms, thirty-one entries on trees, and eleven entries on nuts.

== Function ==
In the Middle Ages the prevalent thought was that the natural world is a reflection of God and that careful study of the natural world can help us more fully understand Gods divine plan. In that context medieval bestiaries act more as hexaemeron than as an encyclopedia of flora and fauna. They are meant to be moralizing and were functionally used as a teaching manual for religious clerics as evidenced by the added entries for sermons. Not only did bestiaries act as curriculum for training clerics but they offer a wide range of well liked and easily accessible sermon material for clerics to use. Specifically within the Northumberland Bestiary there are sporadic patterns of sermon which can be easily paraphrased and rearranged.

== Hyena ==
Bestiaries generally work at establishing clearly defined categories and binaries, for example, male or female, physical or divine, living or dead. Animals such as amphibians (living in both land and water), pigs (having hooves but being carnivorous) which did not fit easily into a category or binary were often considered unclean or even seen as bad omens. Hyenas were seen as both unclean and as morally reprehensible because it was believed that they possessed both male and female sex organs and that they fed off of human corpses. In some depictions the Hyena has a vagina that more closely resembled an anus in an attempt to convey both physical and moral filth. This iconographical choice also marks the Hyena as oversexed and connotes sodomy. The Hyena specifically carried strong antisemitic symbolism. In the Aberdeen Bestiary the entry on the hyena actually states that the hyenas double sex symbolizes the "uncleanliness of Jews." The hyena is also often depicted as having a circumcised penis alluding to jewish religious practices. In the Northumberland Bestiary on folio 12v the miniateure shows the Hyena not only double sexed and circumsized but also eating a corpse out of a tomb. The accompanying entry states "In this way the prophet compared the synagogue to this unclean animal saying My inheritance has become for me like a cave of a hyena." The entry also states that the hyena stalks the huts of shepherds, can imitate human voices and sobs in order to trick men at night, that it eats dogs (dogs often symbolize religious clerics within bestiaries) and that it carries a stone in its eyes which can freeze any man or beast that it circles three times. The idea of the "trans-animal body" is a more recent topic of modern scholarship which looks at bestiaries as a resource for transgender history.

== Gallery ==
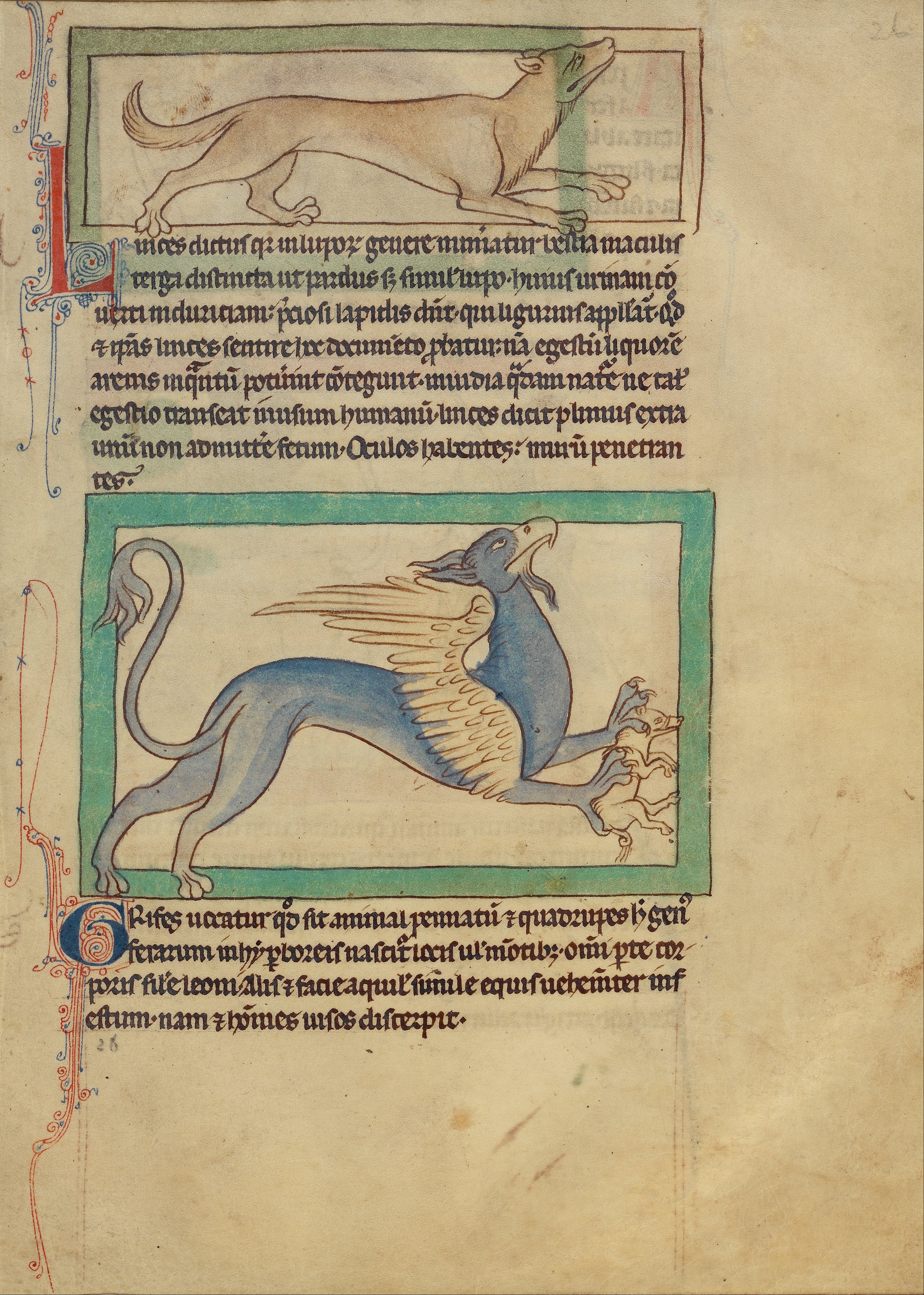
Lynx and griffin, f.26

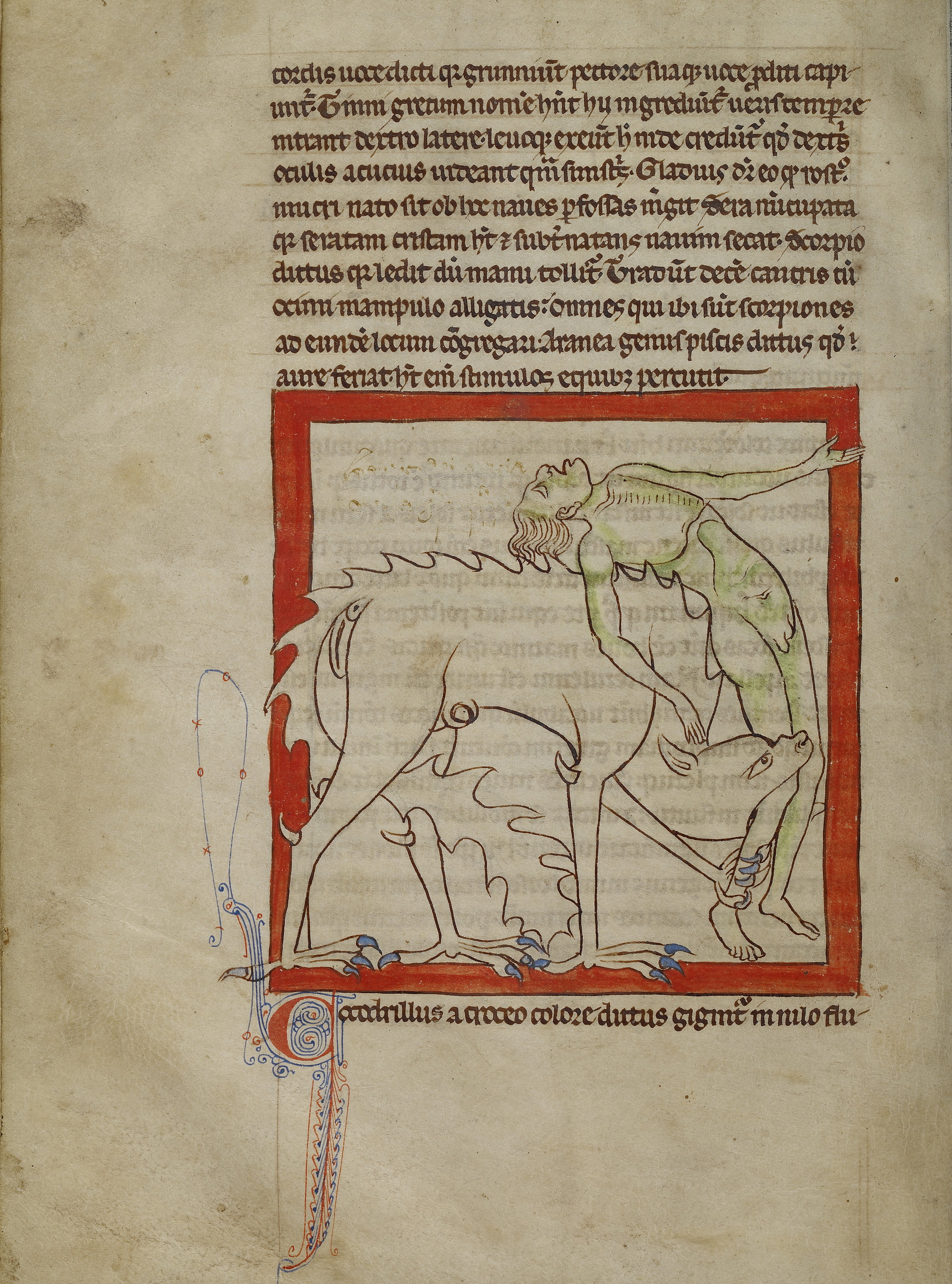
Crocodile eating a man, f.49v

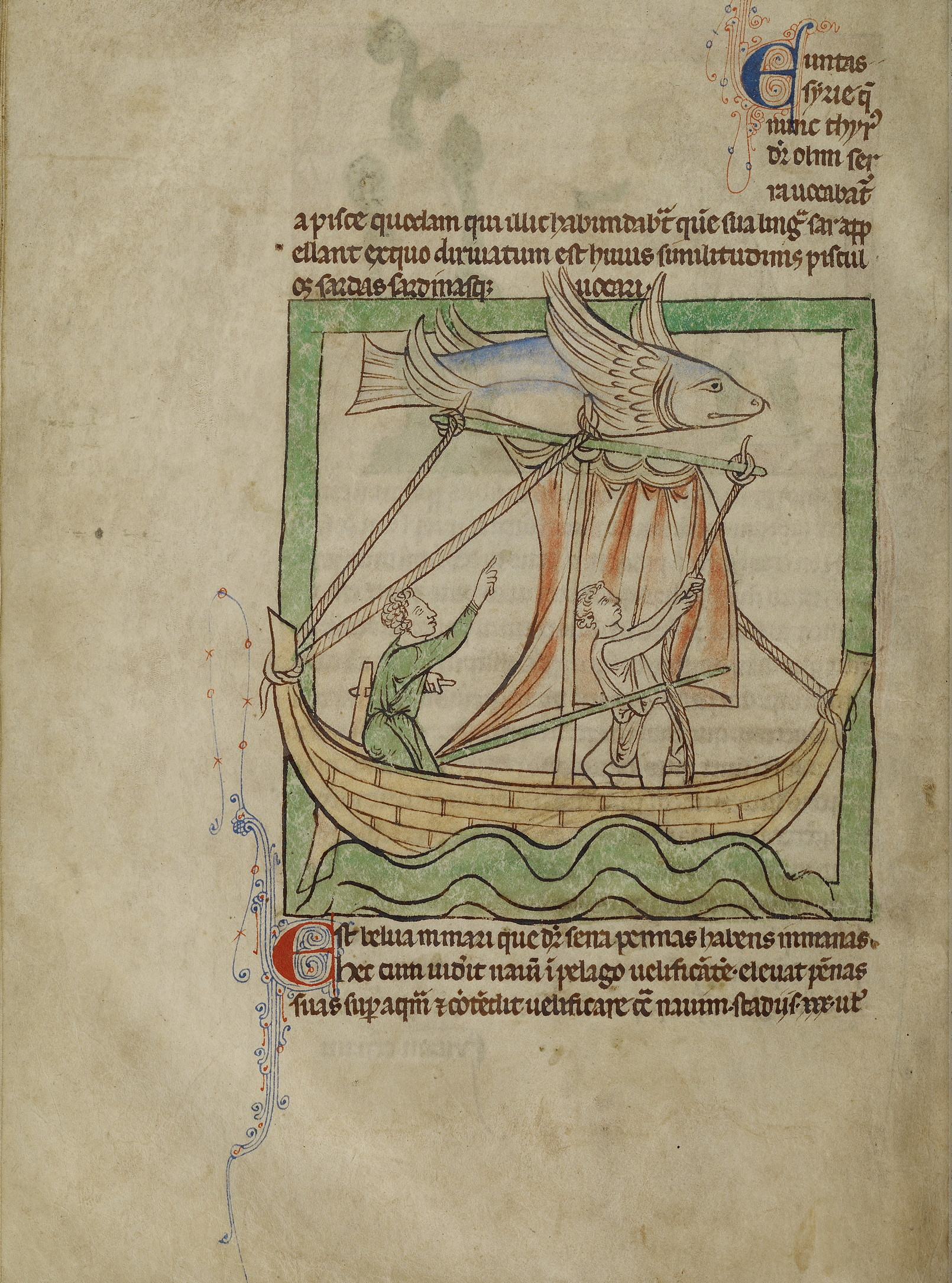
Flying fish, f.46v

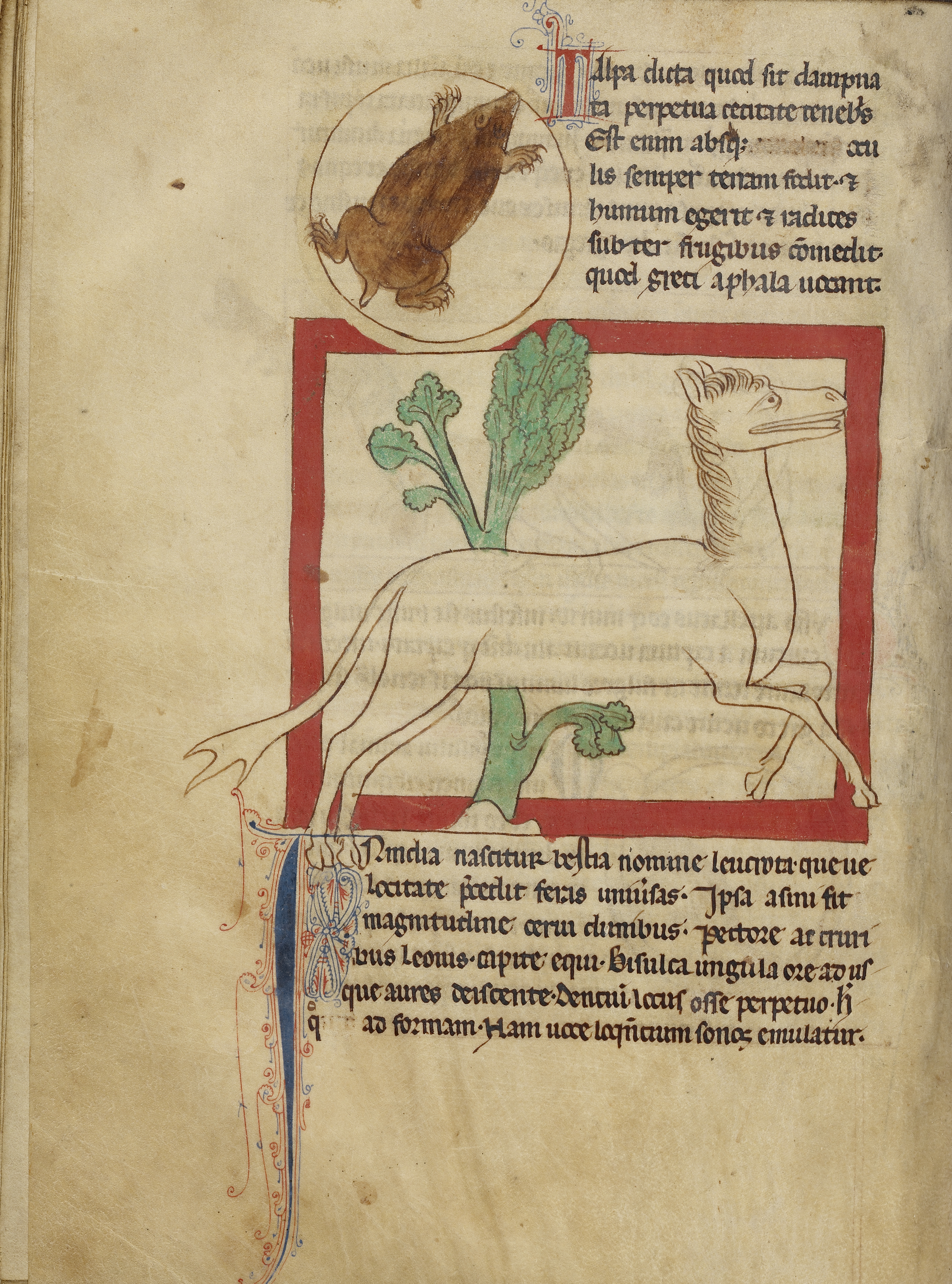
A Mole; A Leucrota f.33v

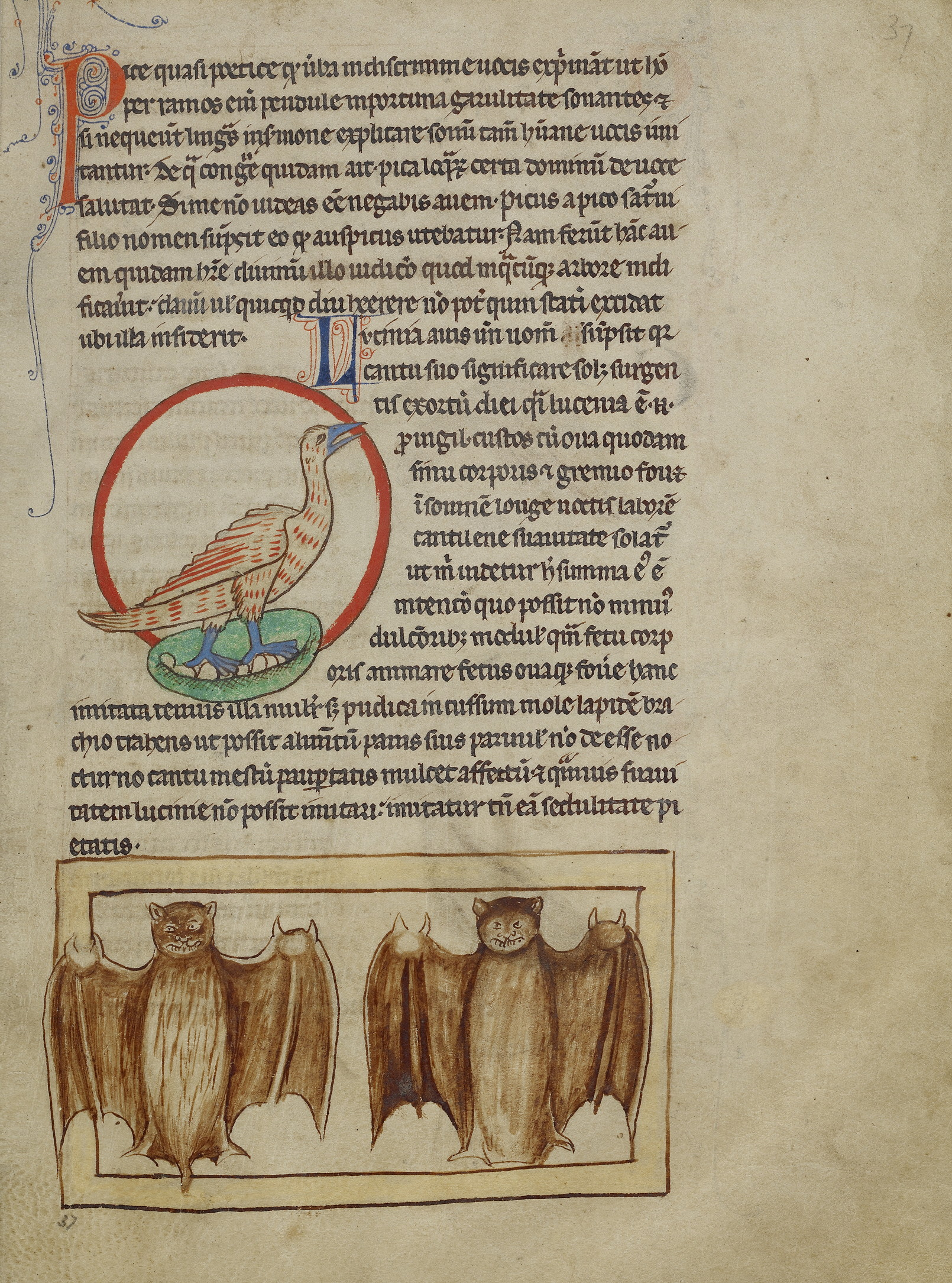
A Nightingale; Bats f.37r

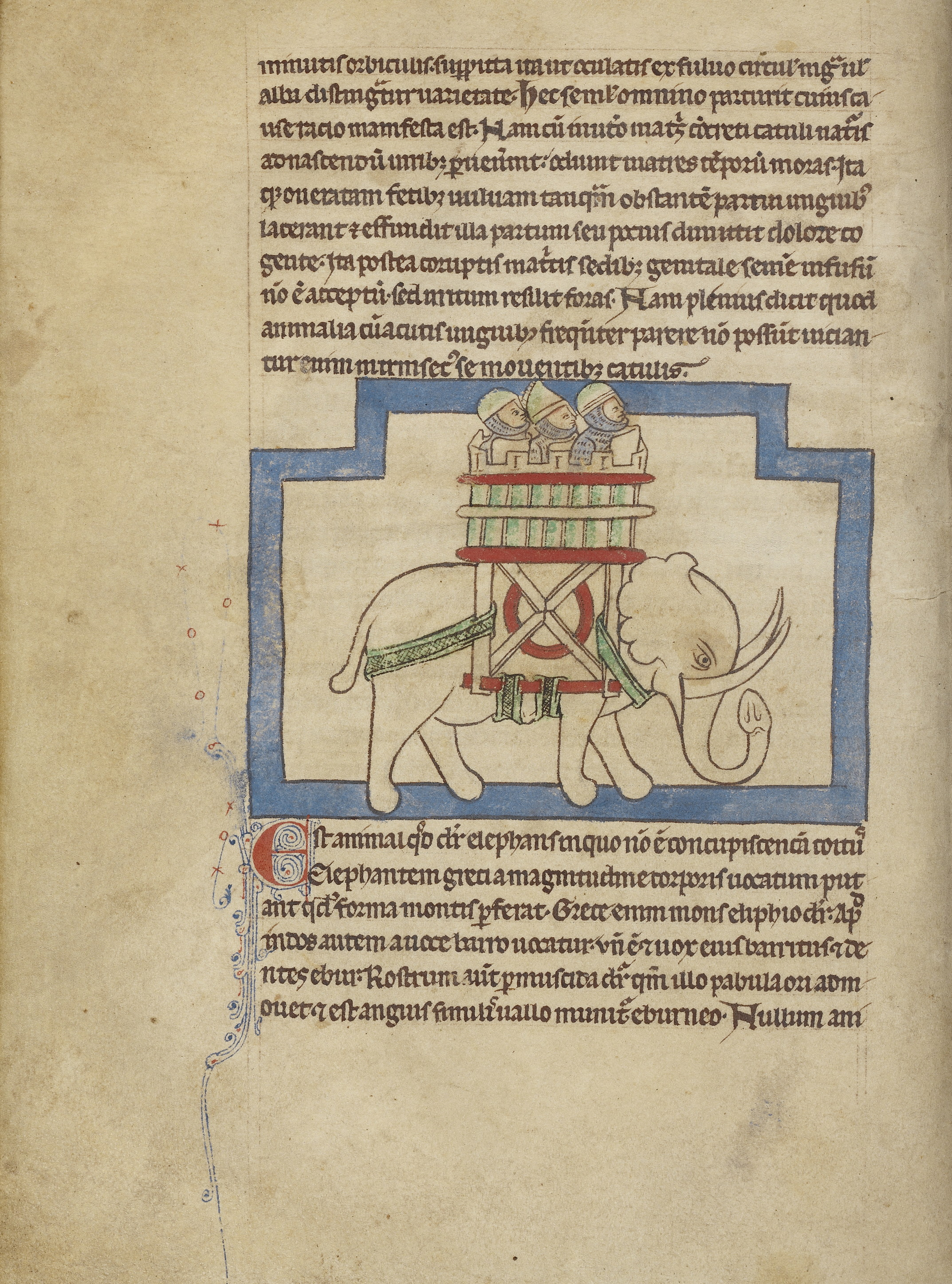
Elephant carrying soldiers f.17v

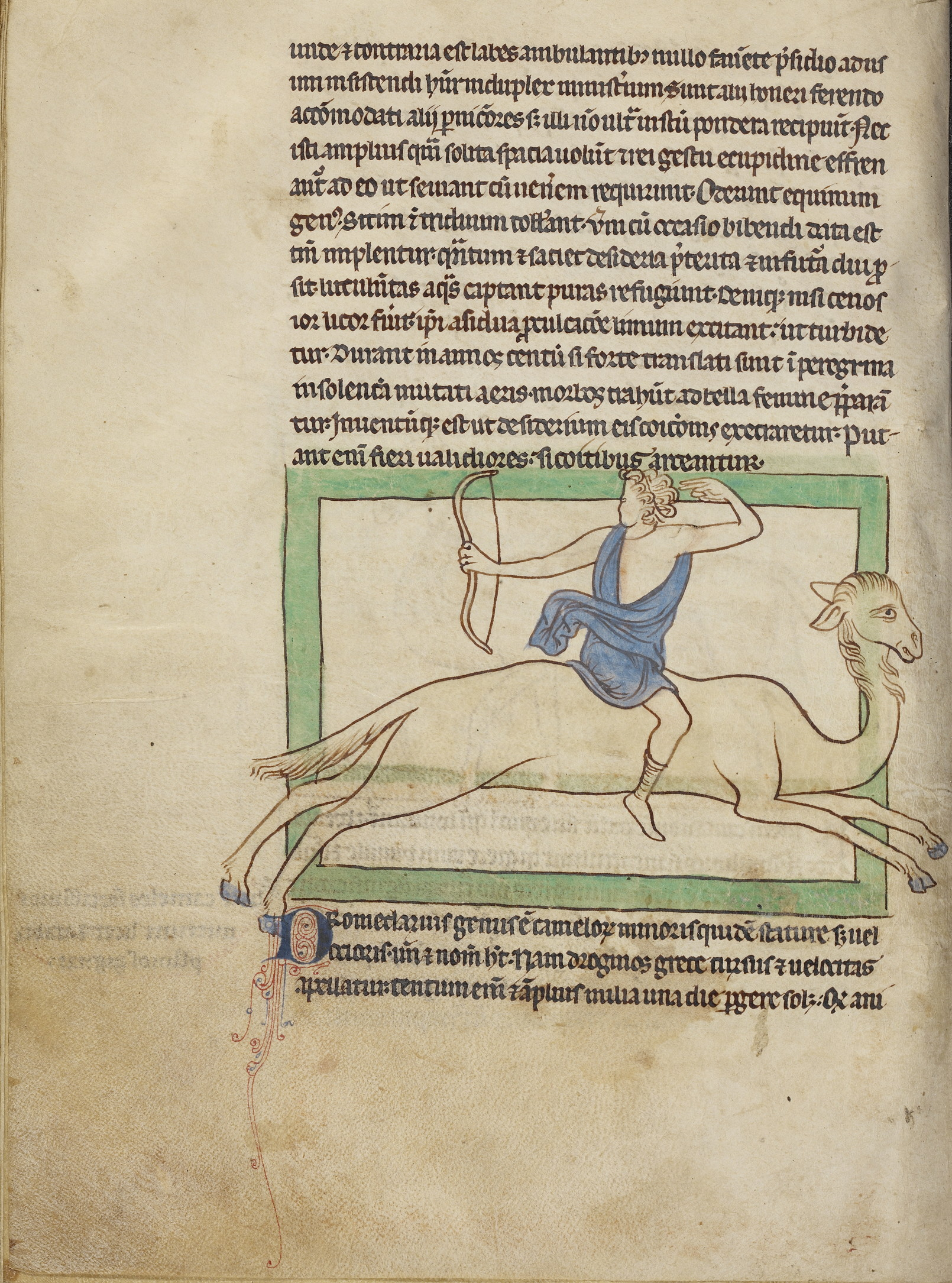
A Dromedary (dromedarius) carries an archer f.30v

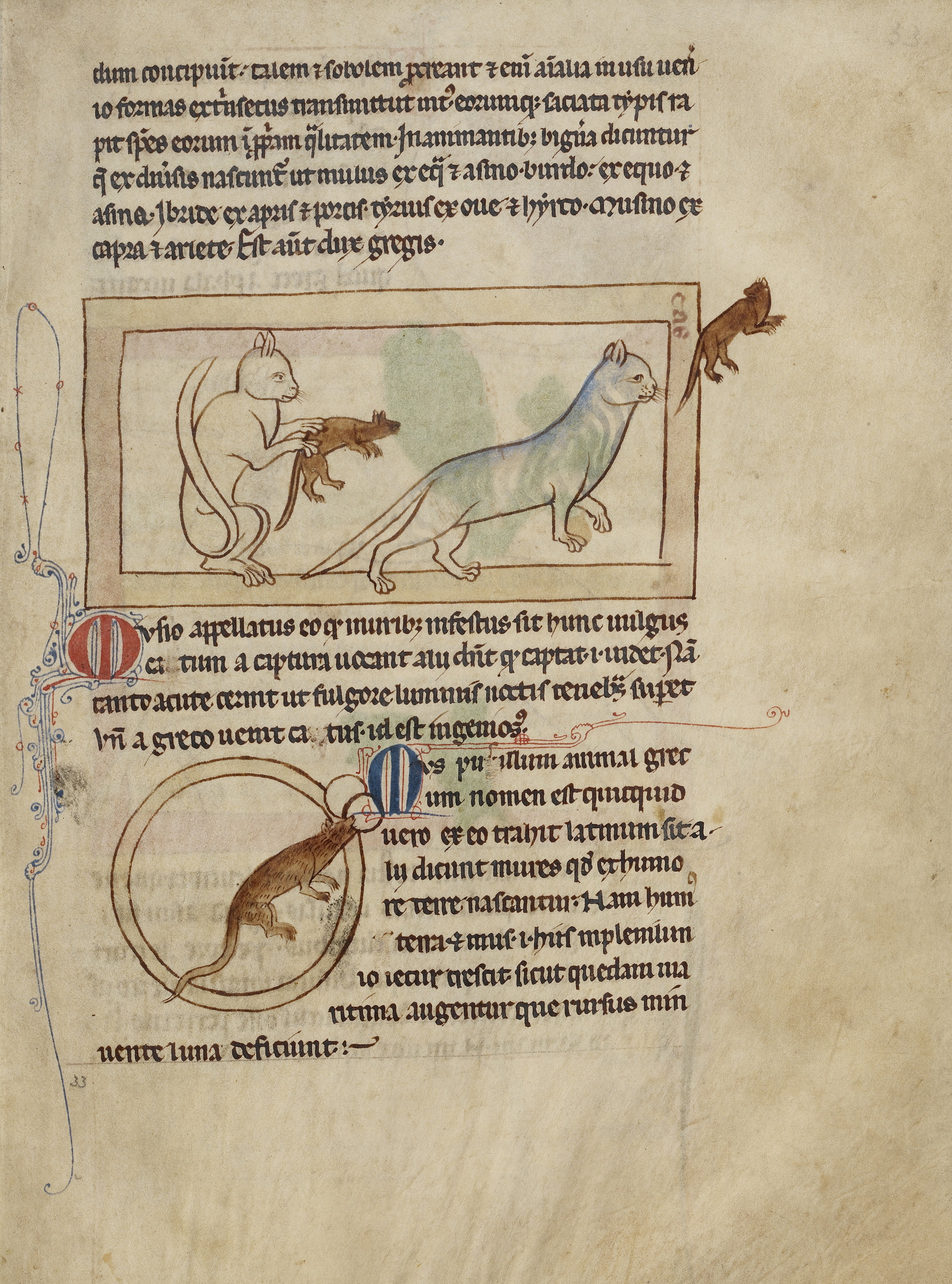
A Mouser carrying a Mouse ready to pounce on another mouse f.33r

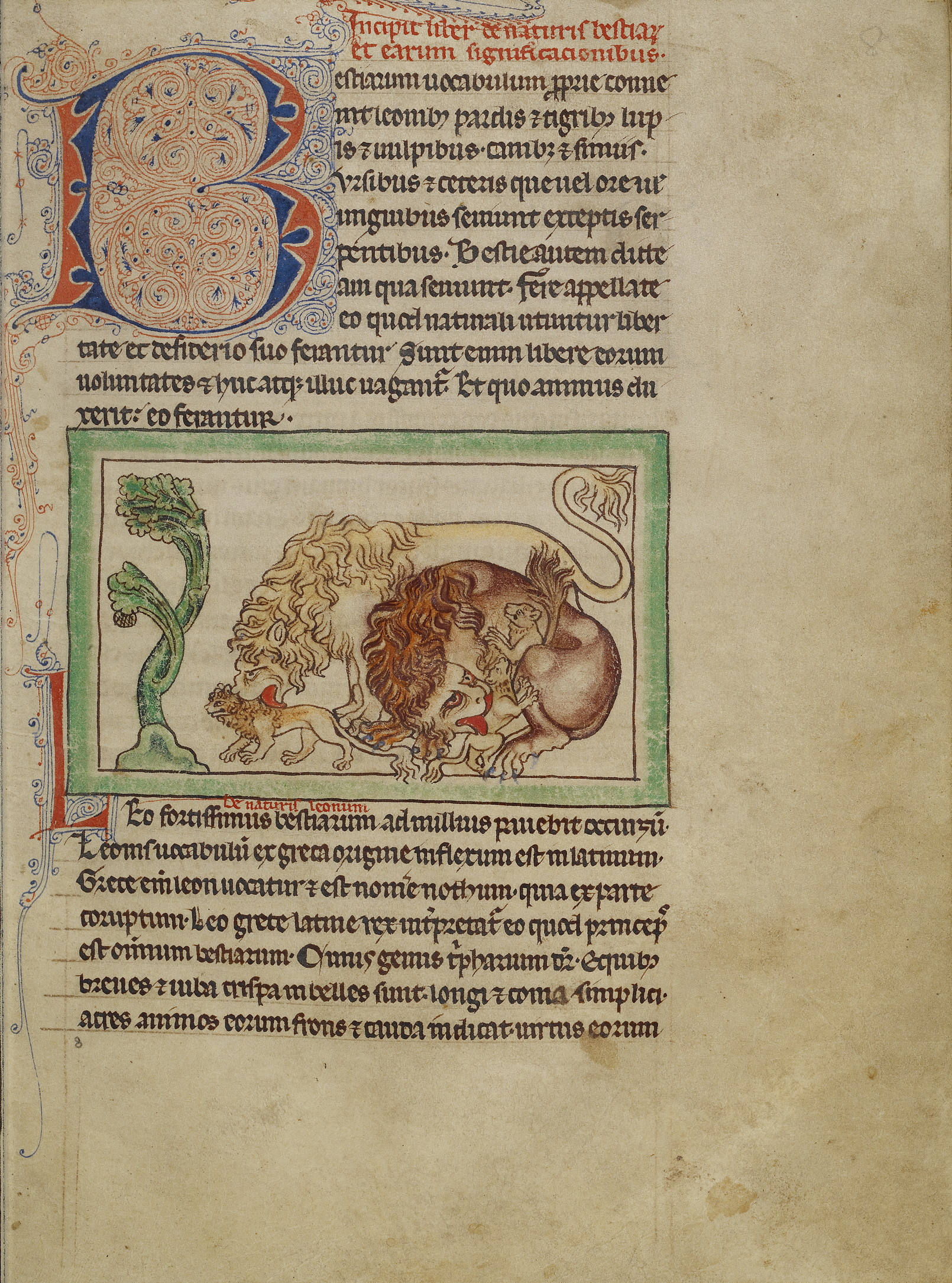
Lions licking cubs f.8r

== See also ==
- List of most expensive books and manuscripts

== Bibliography ==
- Eric G. Millar, A Thirteenth-Century Bestiary in the Library of Alnwick Castle, Oxford, Roxburghe Club, 1958
- Cynthia White, From the Ark to the Pulpit. An Edition and Translation of the Transitional Northumberland Bestiary (13th century), Turnhout: Brepols Publishers, 2009
- Cynthia White, The Northumberland Bestiary and the Art of Preaching, Reinardus, vol.18, numéro 1, 2005, p. 167-192
- Melanie Holcomb (ed.), Pen and Parchment: Drawing in the Middle Ages, New York, Metropolitan Museum of Art, 2009, 188 p. (ISBN 9781588393180, lire en ligne [archive]), p. 144-145
