= Sens Cathedral =

Catholic cathedral in Yonne, France

Sens Cathedral Cathédrale Saint-Étienne de Sens
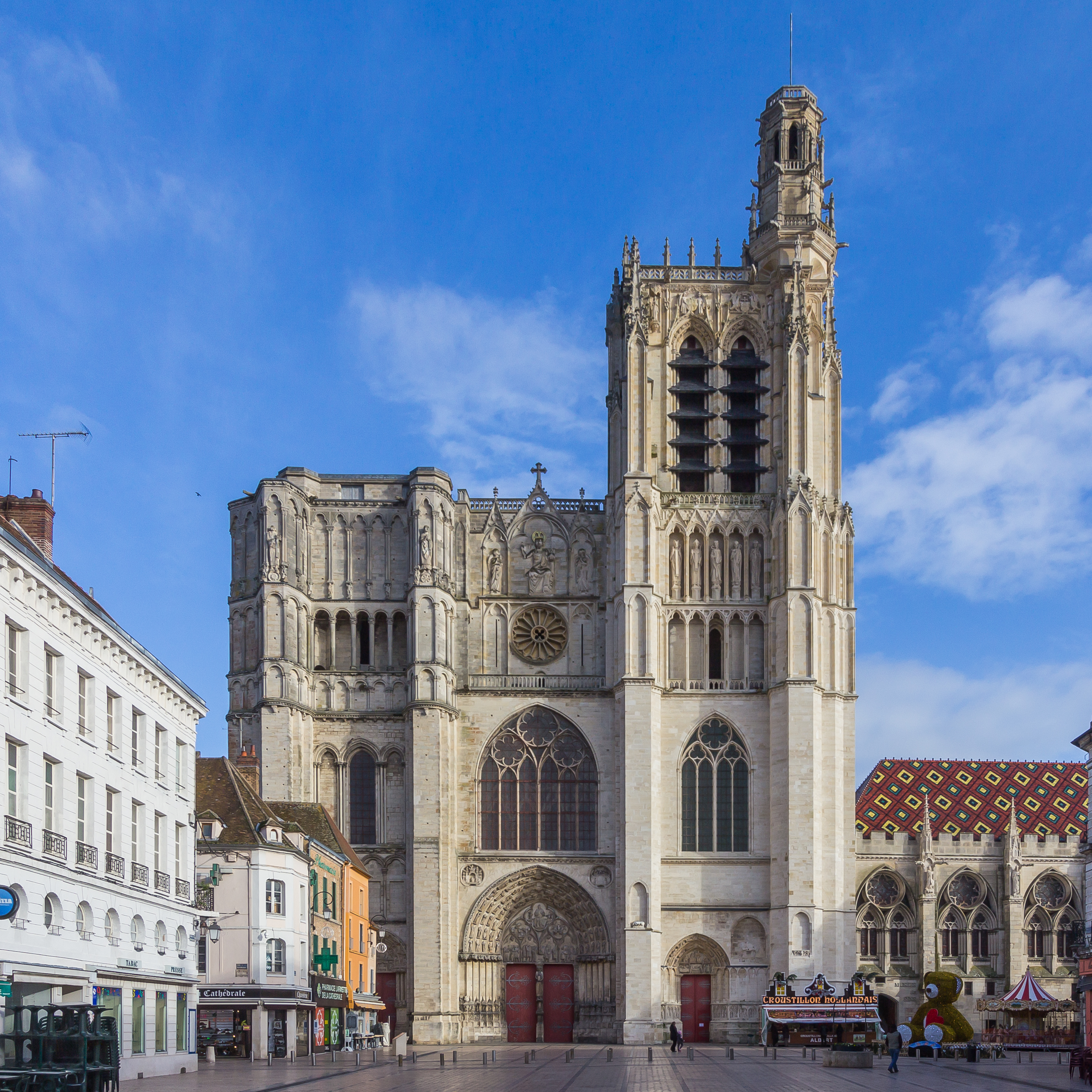

Religion
- Affiliation: Roman Catholic Church
- Province: Archdiocese of Sens
- Ecclesiastical or organisational status: Cathedral
- Status: Active

Location
- Location: Sens, France
- Interactive map of Sens Cathedral; Cathédrale Saint-Étienne de Sens
- Coordinates: 48.1979°N 3.2837°E

Architecture
- Type: church
- Style: Gothic
- Groundbreaking: 1135
- Completed: 1164 (nave); 1515 (transept); 1534 (south tower)
- Height (max): 78.25 metres (256.7 ft)

Sens Cathedral (French: Cathédrale Saint-Étienne de Sens) is a Catholic cathedral in Sens in Burgundy, eastern France. The cathedral, dedicated to Saint Stephen, is the seat of the Archbishop of Sens.

Sens was the first cathedral to be built in the Gothic architectural style (the Basilica of Saint Denis, the other pioneer Gothic building built at about the same time, was an Abbey, not a cathedral). The choir was begun between 1135 and 1140, shortly before Notre Dame de Paris. The sanctuary was consecrated in 1164, but work continued until 1176. It is a national monument of France. The structure was completed in the late 15th–early 16th century with Flamboyant style transepts and a new tower. The architecture of its choir influenced that of Canterbury Cathedral, rebuilt in Gothic style by the master mason William of Sens.

== History ==
Sens was an important and prosperous town during the late Roman Empire, located at the meeting point of two rivers and at the intersection of two major Roman roads. During the Carolingian Empire it became a major center of the early French Christian church.

In 876 AD, Pope John VIII gave the Archbishop of Sens the title "Primate of the Gauls and Germans". He was placed at the head of six and later seven dioceses, including Paris, Chartres, Orleans, and Troyes. The religious jurisdiction was transferred to the Archbishop of Lyon in the 11th century, but the Archbishop of Sens still keeps the honorific title "Primate of the Gauls and Germans".

=== Construction (1130–1160) ===
The first cathedral of Sens described in medieval records was built sometime between the 6th and 9th centuries, probably on the same site. According to medieval records, it was composed of three separate buildings, a baptistry and two churches. The date of their construction is not recorded, but medieval chronicles report they were destroyed by fire between 958 and 967, and replaced by a single structure.

By the 12th century, Sens was flourishing economically and growing in population. In 1122, Henri Sanglier, a member of the court of Louis VI of France, was named archbishop of Sens and began the project of building a larger and grander cathedral. In 1128 the new bishop received a series of letters from Saint Bernard of Clairvaux, founder of the Cistercian order, urging him as an archbishop to live a less luxurious and more austere life, advice which the new archbishop followed, as he amassed the funds and resources needed for his cathedral.

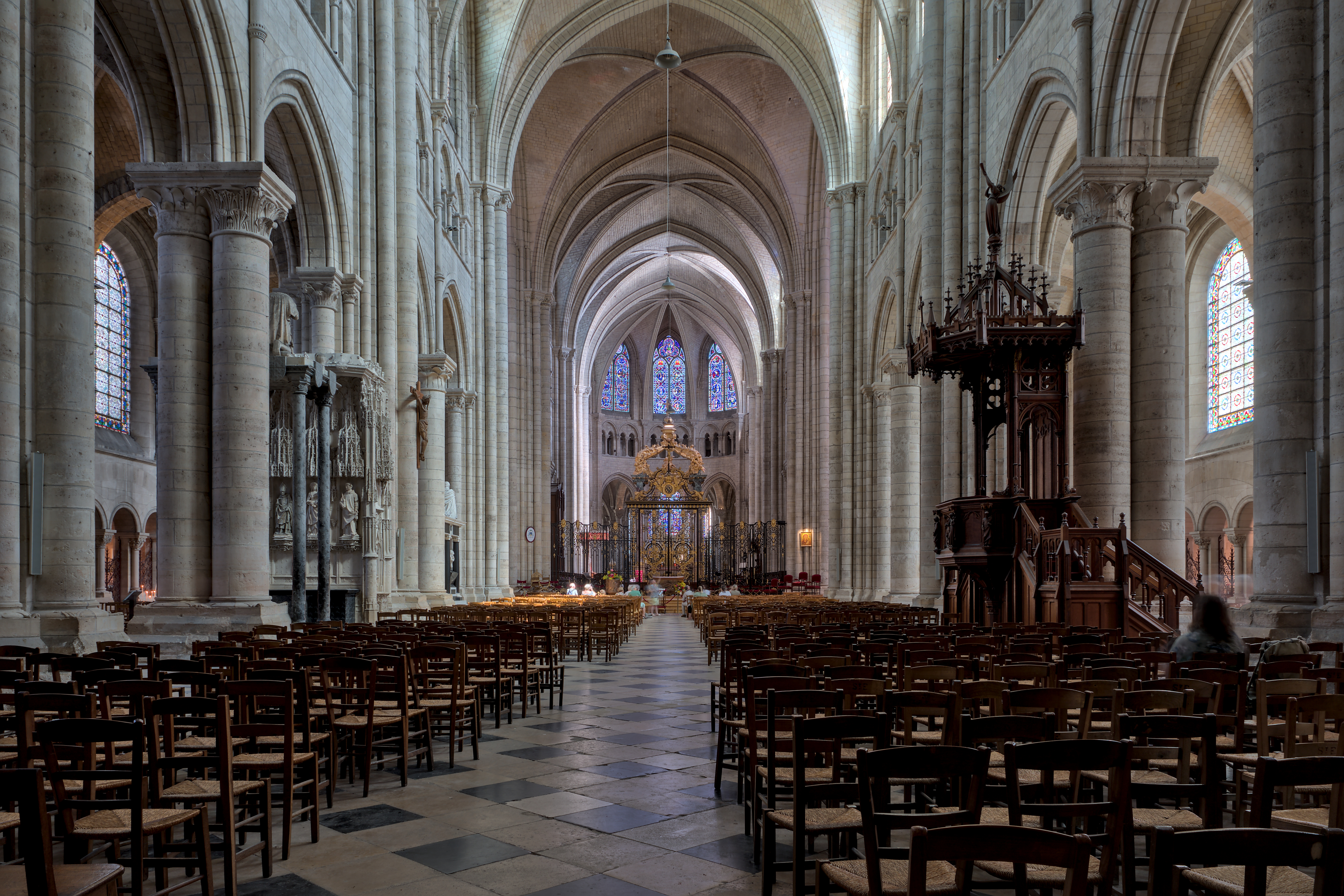
The three levels and six-part rib vaults of the nave of Sens Cathedral

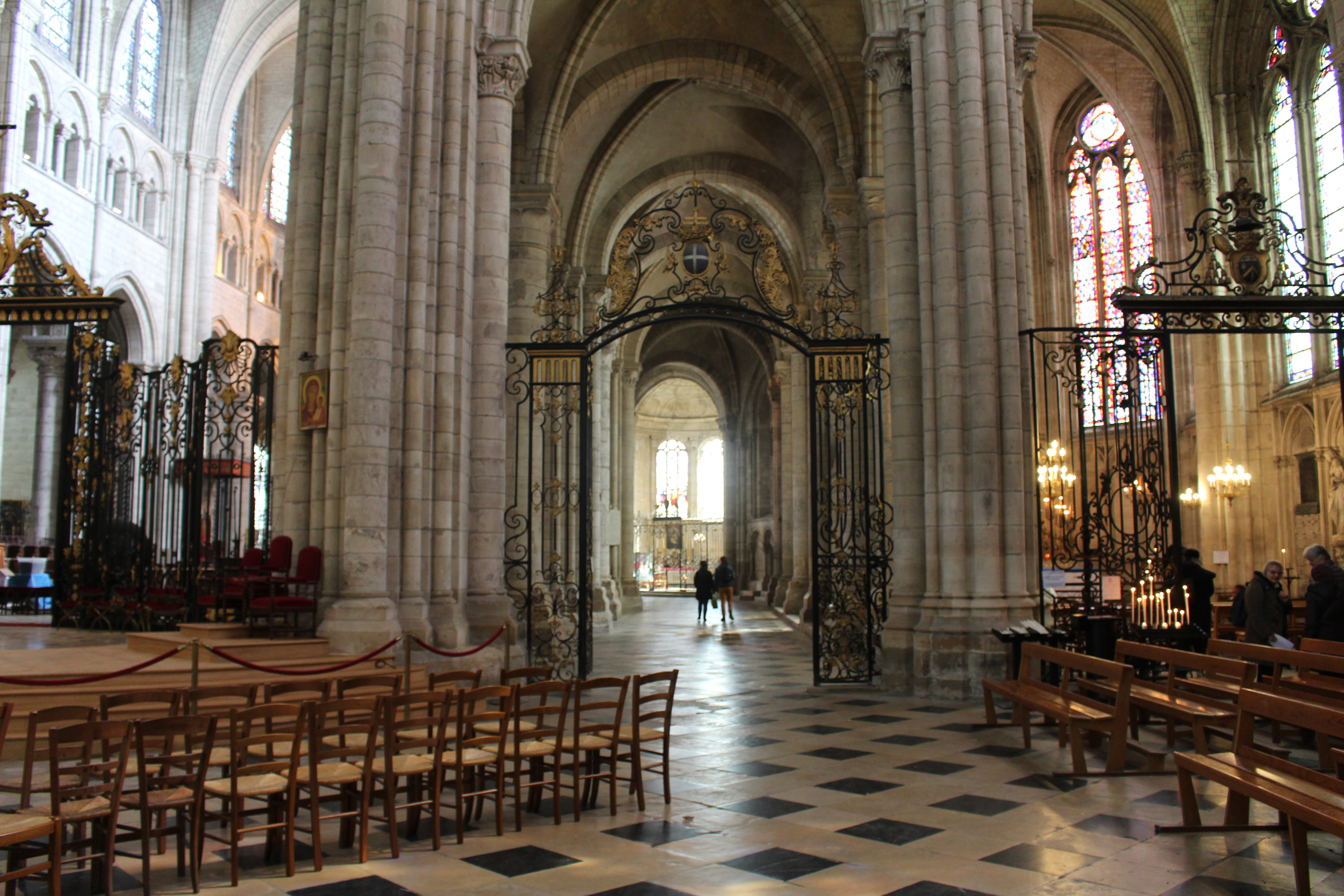
The ambulatory of the choir

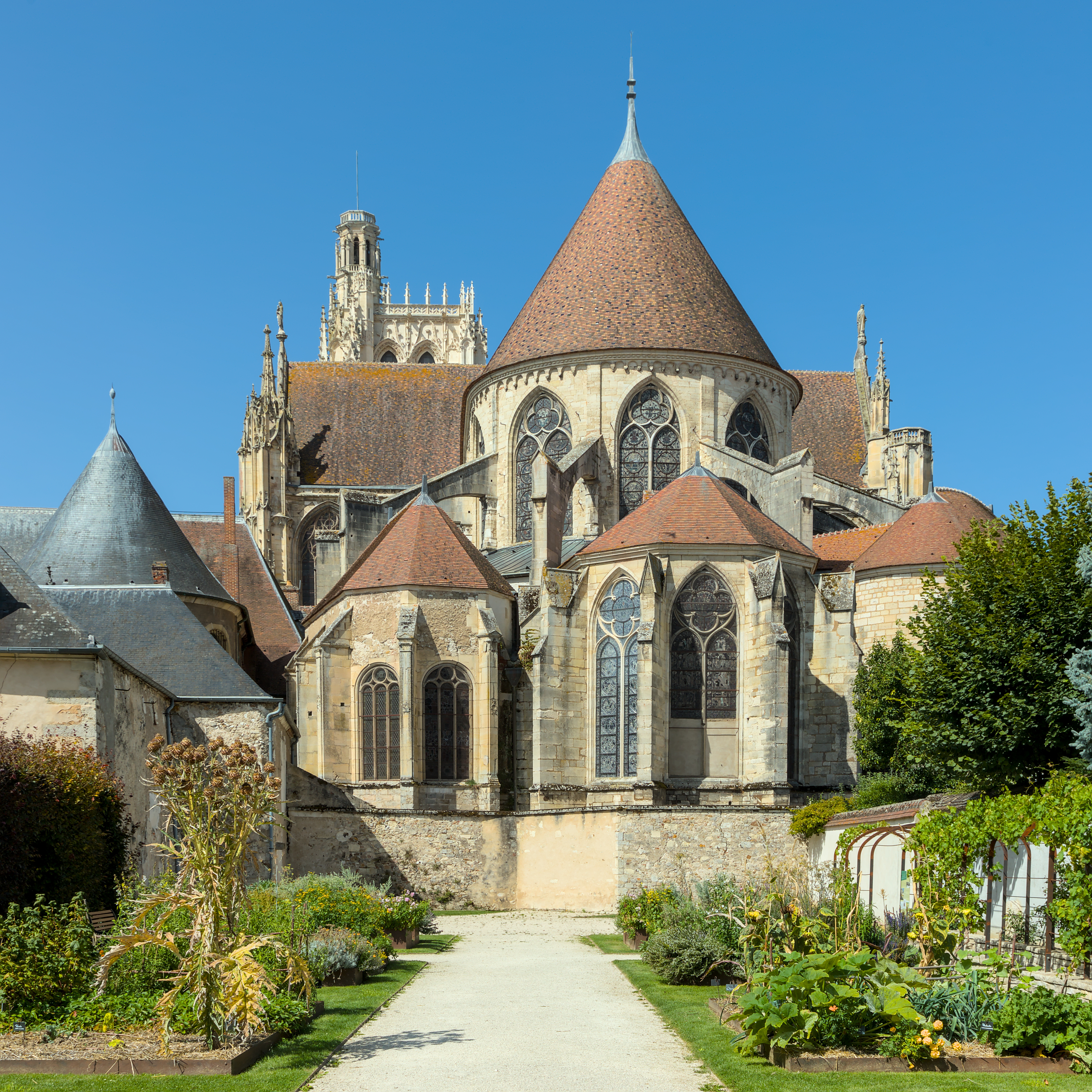
The apse and radiating chapels

Construction of the new cathedral began between 1130 and 1135. The vaulting over the nave and choir was revolutionary, composed of square six-part rib vaults, which distributed the weight downward to alternating columns and piers between the bays. These vaults had been used experimentally in one portion of Durham Cathedral in England and at Saint Denis Basilica near Paris, but Sens was the first cathedral to use them throughout the structure.

Above the arcades of pillars and columns on the ground floor was the triforium, which overlooked the lower roof, and above that the clerestory, or upper walls. Thanks to the new flying buttresses installed outside between the bays to the walls, the clerestory was later given large stained glass windows.

The ground floor of the new cathedral had the traditional form of a basilica, with a long nave and a large choir, and no transepts. A walkway or ambulatory surrounded the outside of the nave and choir. There were two chapels flanking the choir. Excavations in the 20th century showed there had originally been a rectangular chapel in the apse at the east end, hidden by later modifications. The dimensions of the new cathedral were extraordinary for the time: 113.5 metres long, 27.5 metres wide, and with a height of 24.4 metres. The church is larger in overall scale than its contemporaries at Saint Denis, Noyon or Senlis. The first phase of construction was completed by about 1160. It had an immediate influence on the construction of other churches, particularly the choir of the Abbey church of Saint-Germain-des-Pres in Paris, completed in 1163, and Vézelay Abbey (completed about 1180).

=== Pope Alexander III and Thomas Becket ===
Sens Cathedral immediately became a destination for important visitors. Pope Alexander III came to Sens with his court in September 1163, in the midst of a dispute with The Emperor Frederick Barbarossa, and remained for three years. At the end of 1164, Thomas Becket, the Archbishop of Canterbury, came to Sens as an exile, forced to leave because of his opposition to the seizure of church property by King Henry II of England. Becket remained in France until December 1170. He returned to England, where he was murdered by four knights in Canterbury Cathedral. A collection of personal effects belonging to Becket, including his church vestments, are on display in the treasury of Sens Cathedral. A major window on the north side of the choir of the cathedral, made in 1200–1210, illustrates the life of Becket.

The founder of the cathedral, Henri Sanglier, died in 1142, and the work was carried on by his successors, archbishops Hugues de Toucy (1142–1168) and then Guillaume de Champagne (1169–1176), before he became archbishop of Reims (1176–1202). The last part of the original cathedral to be completed was the west facade, with its three portals and original two towers.

=== A Royal Wedding and modifications (13th–16th century) ===
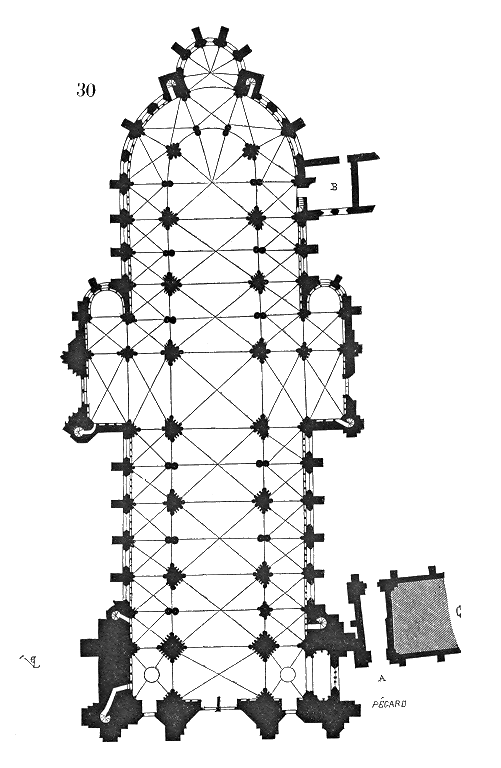
Floor plan with new north and south transepts (16th c.)

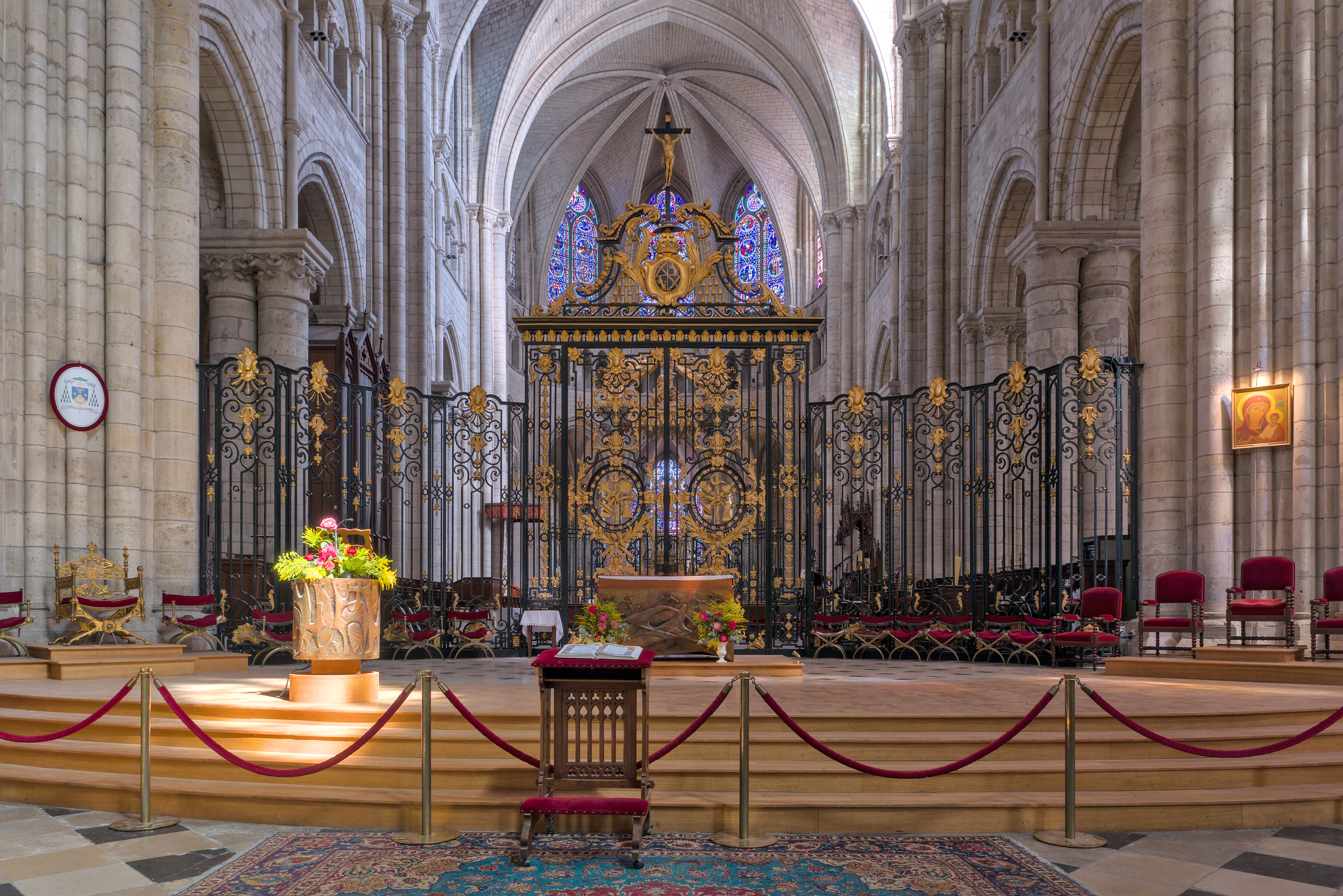
The choir screen

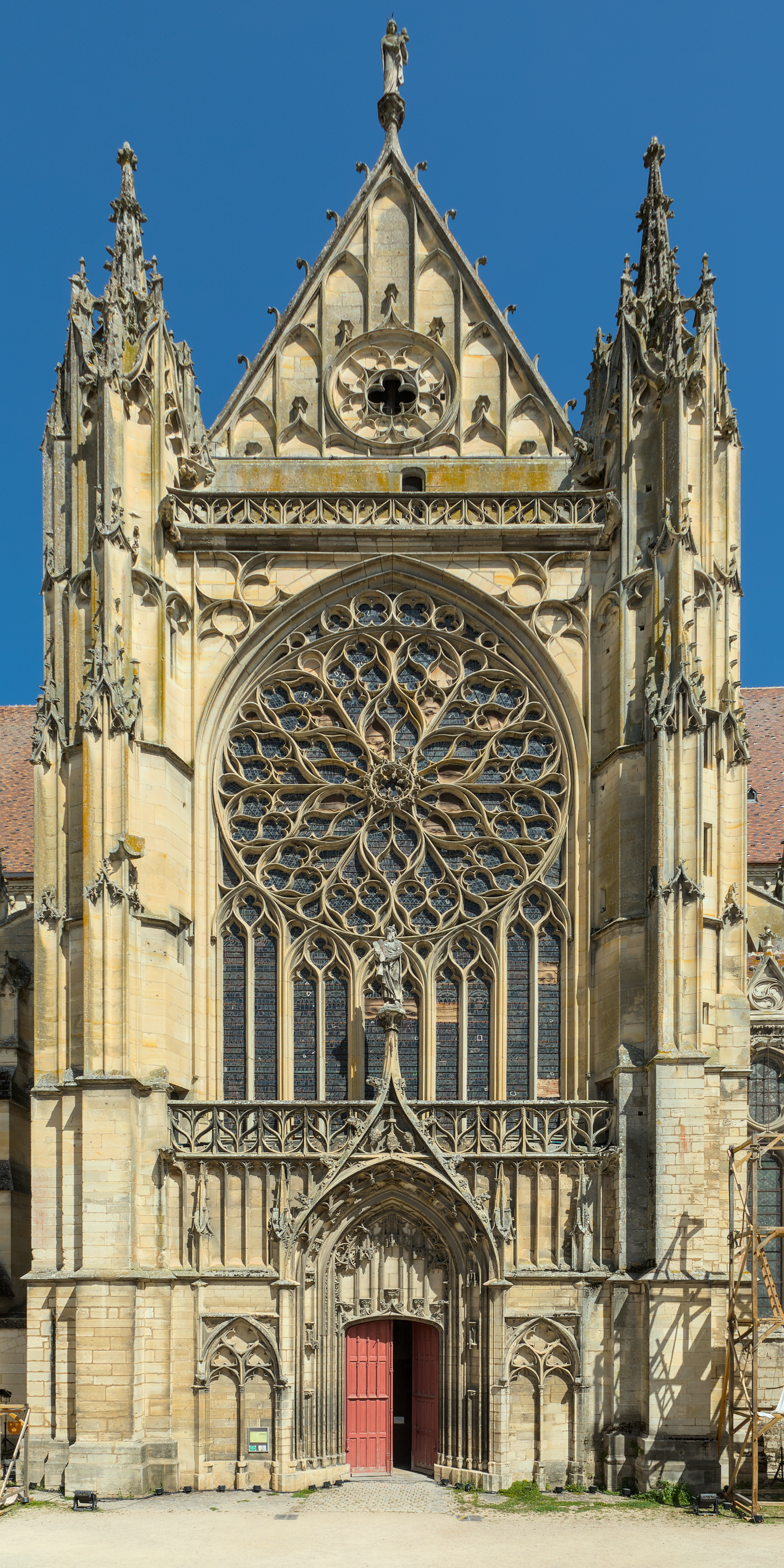
The South transept rose window and portal, in the Flamboyant Gothic style (15th c.)

Under a new archbishop, Gauthier Cornut (1221–1241), the cathedral was the site of an important royal wedding, between King Louis IX and Marguerite of Provence on 27 May 1234, which solidified the alliance between France and Provence. The cathedral also briefly hosted the reputed Crown of Thorns from the Crucifixion, purchased by Louis IX from the Emperor of Constantinople, as it was handed over to the King with great ceremony, and then transported by boat to Paris for eventual placement in the Sainte-Chapelle.

Archbishop Cornut made a series of important modifications. To bring in more light, He raised the upper walls of the choir and installed larger stained glass windows, a process that also took place at Notre Dame de Paris at about the same time. This project was continued by Cornut's successors, and was not finished until 1309. He also began the construction of the Archbishops' palace adjoining the cathedral, the remodelling of the Saint Severin chapel, and the installation of an ornate jubé, or rood screen, between the choir and nave.

The works were interrupted by a disaster, the collapse on 5 April 1268 of the south tower, which caused several casualties and damaged the adjoining Archbishop's Palace. The rebuilding of the tower was long delayed for lack of funds, but was finally completed by a legacy in the will of the Archbishop Étienne Bécard de Penoul (1292–1309).

The same Archbishop also remade the Chapel of Saint Savinien. The original rectangular chapel was replaced by a more ornate polygonal structure with an eight-ribbed vault and five windows. This chapel introduced the High Gothic, or "Classic" style into the cathedral. The 14th century also saw the addition of series of new small chapels for private ceremonies along the aisles on either side of the choir and nave.

The other major 13th-century modification was the reconstruction of the early Gothic Chapel of the Virgin, built in 1150, into the Rayonnant style, with larger and more decorative windows. An even more ambitious project, a transept similar to that of Notre Dame de Paris, was started but, evidently because of a shortage of funds, was not built until between 1490 and 1518. It was finally made in the exuberant late Gothic Flamboyant style by the master mason Martin Chambiges, whose other works included the transept of Senlis Cathedral, of Beauvais Cathedral (1499), and the west front of Troyes Cathedral (1502–1531).

The money for the transept was raised by an ambitious fund-raising campaign, featuring displays of the cathedral relics and special sermons. The King also made a modest contribution from the taxes on his properties in the region. The portal of the new south transept, the portal of Moses, was built first, between 1491 and 1496, A new rose window was installed, along with a Tree of Jesse Window, between 1502 and 1503. Construction of the north transept was begun in about 1502 under a different master builder, Hugues Cuvelier, since Martin Chambiges was by then occupied building the transept of Beauvais Cathedral. The great south rose window, known as the Window of the Angel Musicians, was not put into place until 1515–1517. A few more additions were made in the 16th century. A belfry was added to the new tower (called the lead tower), but the new bells, the largest two of which weighed fourteen tons and twelve tons, were not cast in the foundry and put into place until 1560.

The work on the cathedral was delayed in the late 16th century by the Wars of Religion, opposing Protestants and Catholics. Sens was in the center of the war, not recognising the Protestant King Henry IV, and the city and was besieged without success by a Protestant army. In 1621, the new Archbishop of Paris, Henri de Gondi, persuaded the new King Louis XIII, and Pope Gregory XV to make the Archdiocese of Paris, rather than that of Sens, the principal diocese of France. Thereafter the new Archbishop of Sens, Octave de Belgrade, only had authority over the bishops of neighbouring Auxerre, Nevers and Troyes. Nonetheless, Sens remained an important religious center, attracting monastic communities of the Jesuits, Carmelites, Benedictines, and Ursulines.

=== Later years (17th–18th century) ===
Few important additions to the cathedral were made in the following decades. In 1638, the explosions of cannons firing to celebrate the birth of the future Louis XIV broke the stained glass windows installed over the west portal. They were replaced by plain glass. In 1644 a windstorm broke the stained glass window depicting the patron saints on the north transept. It was replaced with a new window designed by painter Antoine Soulignac in 1646.

The pace of change picked up in the 18th century. In 1760, King Louis XV ordered that the golden table, which served as the centerpiece of the altar, be melted down to help refill the royal treasury after a costly war. In the 1760s two new altars, one devoted to Saint Louis (on the left) and Saint Martin (on right) were put in place along with an ornate wrought iron grill and gateway, with the coat of arms of the Cardinal de Luynes. New stalls were installed in the choir in the 1780s. The stone floor of the cathedral was replaced in 1767–69, which destroyed the labyrinth, which had occupied the entire space of the floor at the entry of the nave. This also caused the removal of many medieval tombstones, which were replaced with simple names and dates. In 1785 A project was prepared for a new west portal of the Church, in the form of a classical portico with columns, designed by François Soufflot, nephew of the future architect of the Pantheon in Paris, but it was rejected too radical. A fund for a "Reconstruction in the Gothic style" was granted by Louis XVI in 1786, but the French Revolution intervened.

=== The Revolution and aftermath ===
The Outbreak of the French Revolution in Sens preceded that in Paris by a day: on 13 July 1789, peasants broke down the gates of the Palace of the Archbishop to seize the grain that had been confiscated and stored in the courtyard. The Archbishop himself, Lomenie de Brienne, took an oath to the new Constitution. The belongings of the cathedral were nationalised on 23 November 1790. In September 1792, the voting for the deputies to the new Convention took place within the cathedral. Archbishop de Brienne became a Constitutional Bishop, and, later in the month, the abolition of the monarchy and declaration of the Republic was announced in the cathedral.

In November 1793, the revolutionary army called the Marseillaises marched from Paris to put down a counter-Revolutionary outbreak in Lyon. They stopped in Sens for a few hours on November 7, 1793, and took the time to smash the sculpture on the central portal of the cathedral, sparing only the statue of Saint-Etienne, because a quick-thinking clergyman had put a Revolutionary cap on its head. Eight of the bells were taken down from the tower to be melted down for their bronze, though the two largest, the bourdons, remained in place. In February 1794 the Festival of Reason was celebrated in the cathedral, and on June 8 the cathedral was formally renamed the Temple of the Supreme Being.

With the end of the Terror, For a time the Catholic Church shared the structure with a semi-religious cult called Theophilanthropy, but in October 1800 the cathedral was entirely returned to its former status. In October 1801, the cathedral came back entirely under the control of the Catholic Church, though Napoleon I refused to restore the special status of Sens having dominance over other cathedrals. Sens became an ordinary parish church.

=== The 19th century – restoration and conflict ===
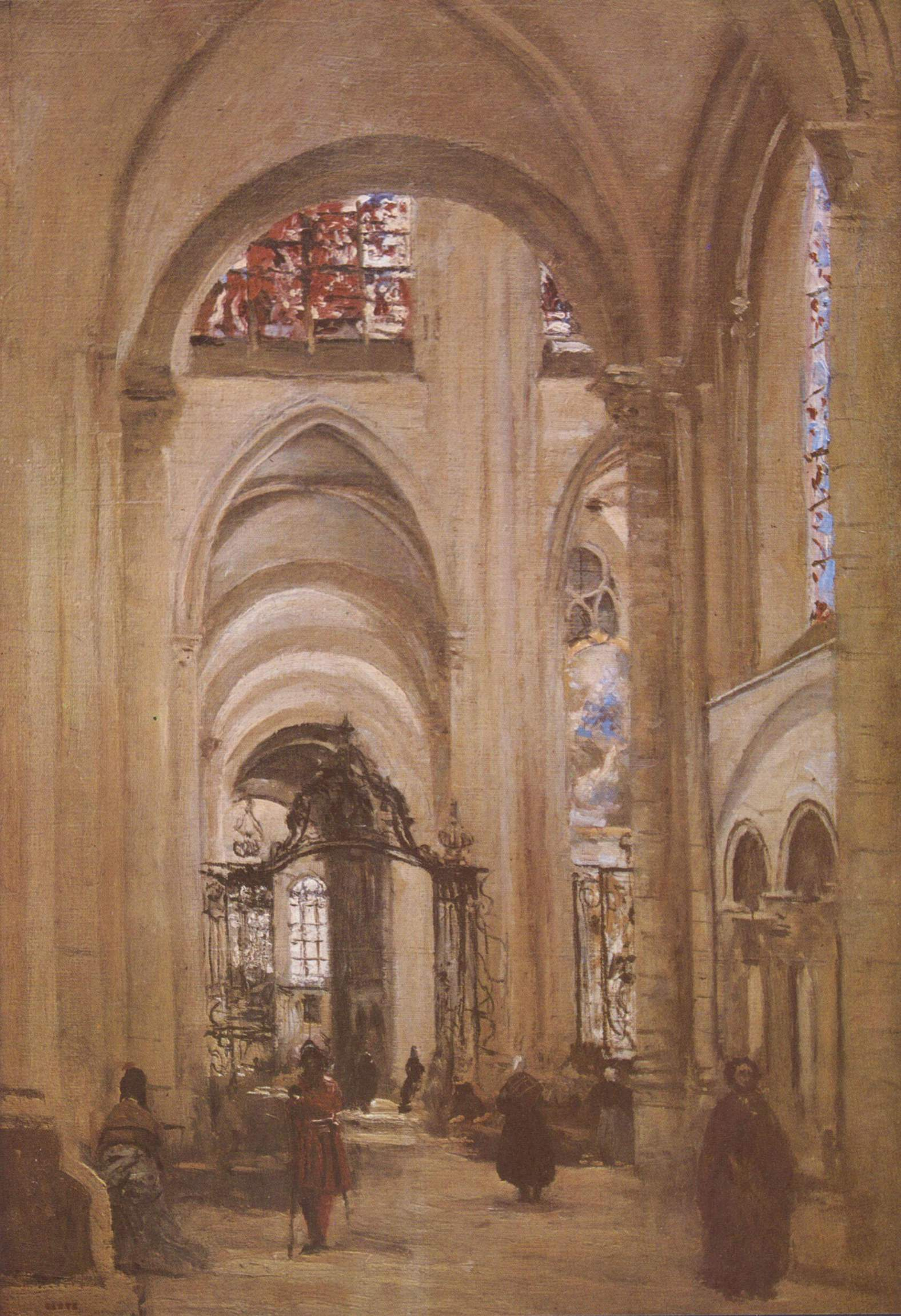
Interior of the cathedral, by Jean-Baptiste-Camille Corot, c. 1874

Sens suffered more damage during the Napoleonic Wars. In February 1814 the town was bombarded by Russian artillery, which damaged some of the stained glass, and in the same month, Prussian soldiers used the cathedral as a barracks. Traces of their cooking fires can still be seen on the stone floors. After the fall of Napoleon, with the restoration of the royal government, in 1817 Sens again had an archbishop, governing churches in Troyes, Nevers and Moulins as well as Sens.

A major project of repair of years and neglect and damage took place from 1834 to 1848, under the direction of the diocese architect, Charles Robelin. Robelin served as the consultant on Gothic cathedrals to Victor Hugo, whose novel Notre Dame de Paris had appeared in 1831. Hugo came to Sens to see the cathedral in 1839 and wrote, "All the contrasts are mixed in this admirable church, and are resolved into harmonies...It is the complicated art of history, it is the religion of the spirit powerfully combined with the philosophy of facts." During the course of the restoration, many of the sculptures were replaced with new works.

In 1847, a new figure in restoration, Eugène Viollet-le-Duc visited the site, and declared that the restoration work of Robelin was "deplorable." He dismissed Robelin, and a new architect, Adolphe Lance, took charge, with a program of demolishing some of the 14th century and later additions and restoring the structure as much as possible to the plan of the 13th century. Old chapels that had been demolished were recreated. Modern panelling and other additions were stripped away, and the weak points of the structure were reinforced with iron. The painter Jean-Baptiste Corot visited the cathedral in 1874 and painted it at this stage of the restoration. Viollet-le-Duc added a gilded bronze armchair, modelled on 12th-century designs, placed in the center of the cathedral, to be the formal seat of the archbishop. Lance died his 1874, and his work was completed in 1898 by Charles Laisne.

=== 20th and 21st century ===
At the beginning of the 20th century, the French church and state were formally separated; priests were no longer paid by the state, and the cathedral itself became the property of the French government. In 1907, the Archbishop had to abandon his palace, which had become state property, and find a different residence. His old residence is now the Museum of Sens.

In the First World War, the cathedral was far from the front lines, but in the Second War the German forces swept through Sens, which was captured on 15 June 1940. The stained glass windows had been taken out and replaced by boards. Five German shells struck the cathedral, causing minor damage. French prisoners of war were initially kept inside the cathedral; they included André Malraux, the future French author and Minister of Culture. In 2014, the cathedral celebrated the 850th anniversary of its consecration.

== Towers and bells ==
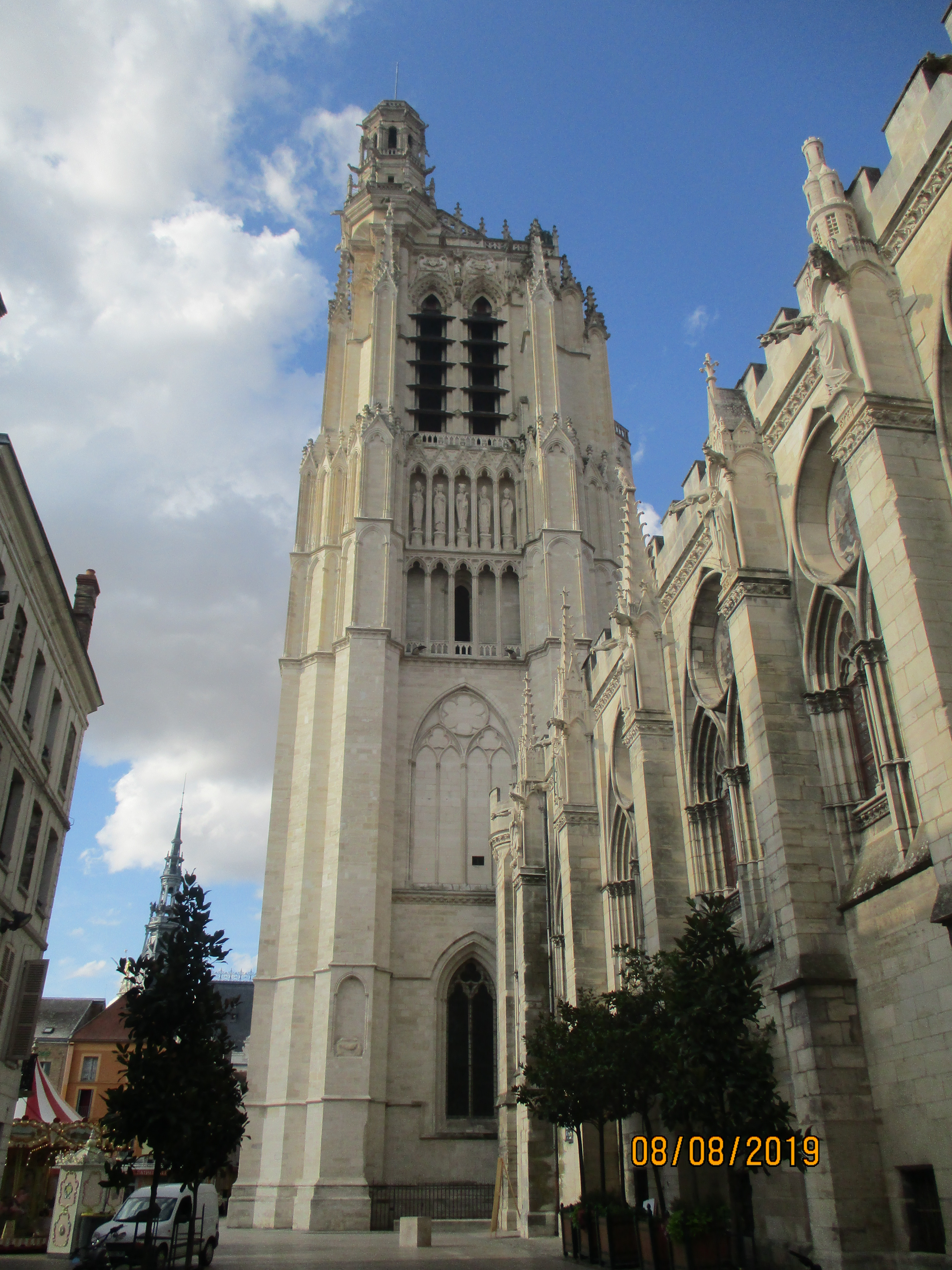
The South Tower of Sens Cathedral

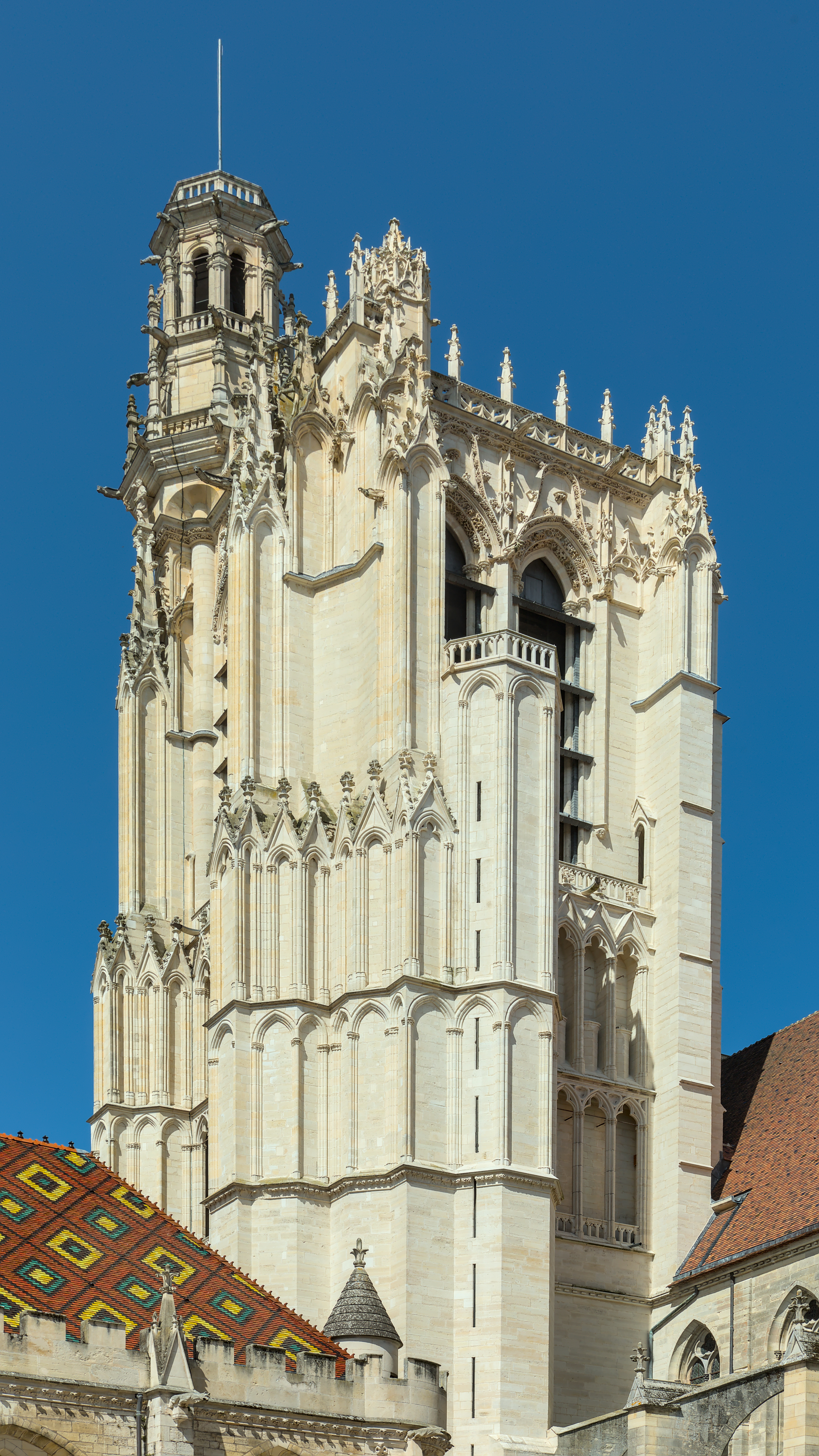
The top of the South Tower and its campanile, or bell tower

The south tower, known as the stone tower, was finished along with the west facade in 1230. However, in 1268, over a period of three days, it collapsed. It was rebuilt, and in 1537 was capped with a campanile in the Renaissance style, which brought its height to 78.25 m (256.7 ft). The north tower was originally topped by an octagonal bell tower, made of wood covered with lead. This structure, called the lead tower, was taken down during the reconstruction of the cathedral in 1848.

The cathedral has seven bells, four in the south bell tower, including the two massive bourdons, and three in the campanile above it. The oldest of the original bells was called Marie, made in 613 for the bishop, Saint Loup. During the French Revolution, Marie and the seven other original bells were taken to Paris to be melted down to be made into cannon.

The Bourdons are among the largest in France. They were cast in 1560. The largest, called the Savinienne, weighs 15,600 kilograms, while the smaller, the Potentienne, weighs 10,000 kilograms. The inscription in Latin on Savinienne translates: "I was forged in Sens, in the year one thousand five hundred sixty. By my sound, and the name of the first Saint-Bishop, the storms and winds do not disturb this climate. I convoke the services, and lament the deaths. Now Pious IV reigns in Rome, the Emperor Ferdinand governs the Germans, King Francis II the Gauls, and Jean, Cardinal Bertrand, the Archdiocese of Sens." Then in French, "Gaspard Mongin-Viard made me."

== West portals ==
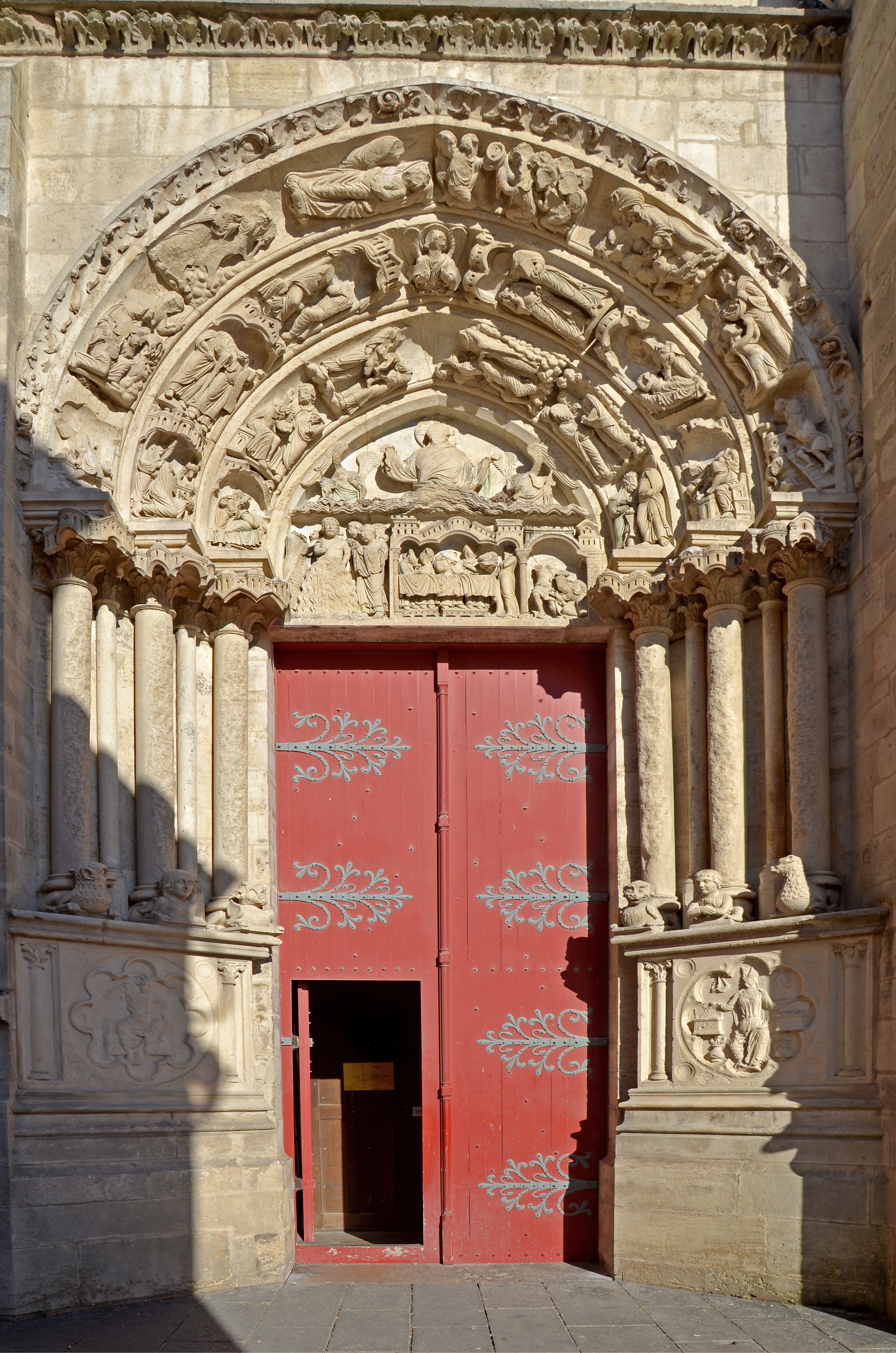
Portal of John the Baptist (1190-1200), oldest of the portals

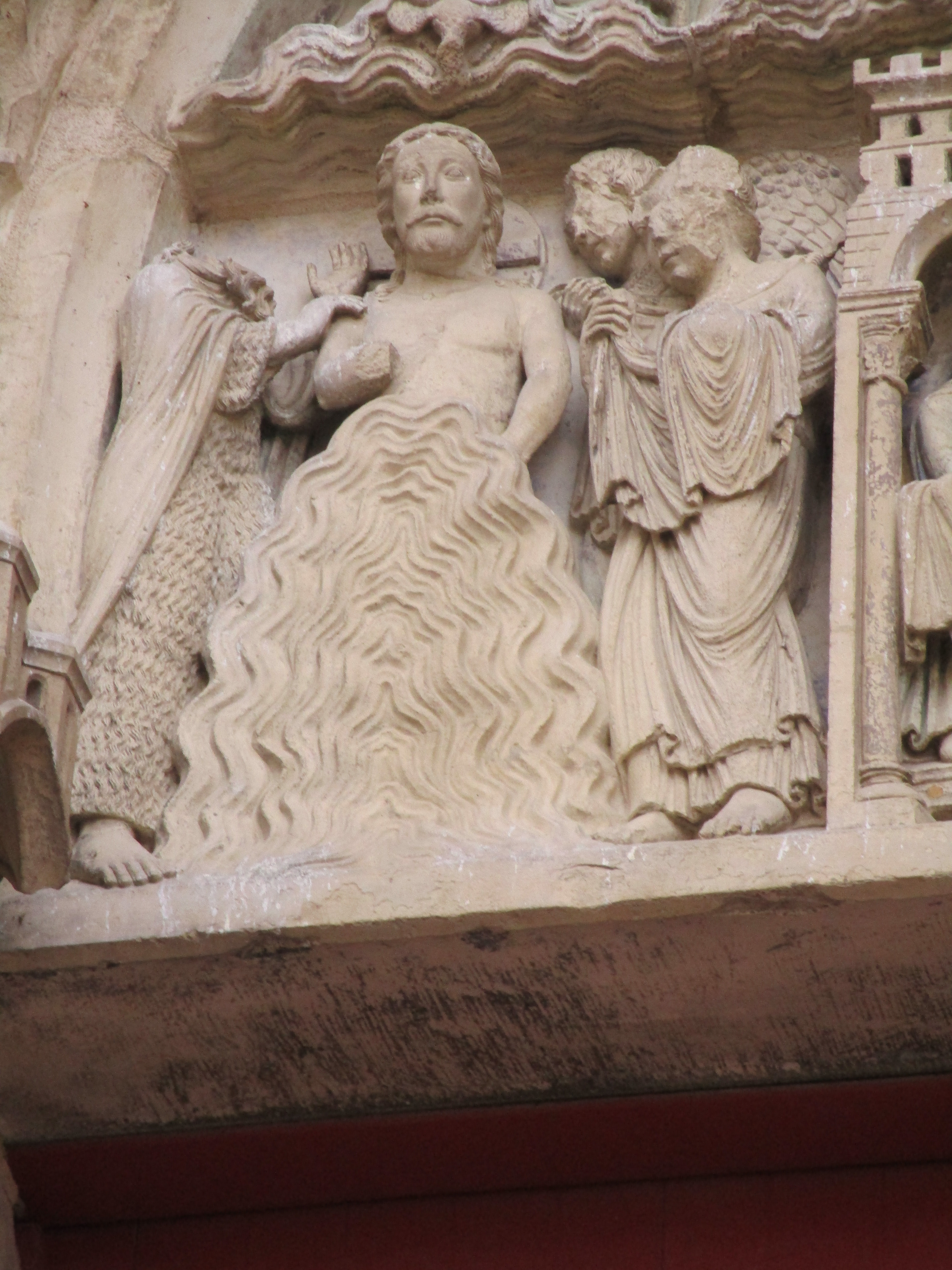
Baptism of Christ North Portal of south facade (1190-1200)

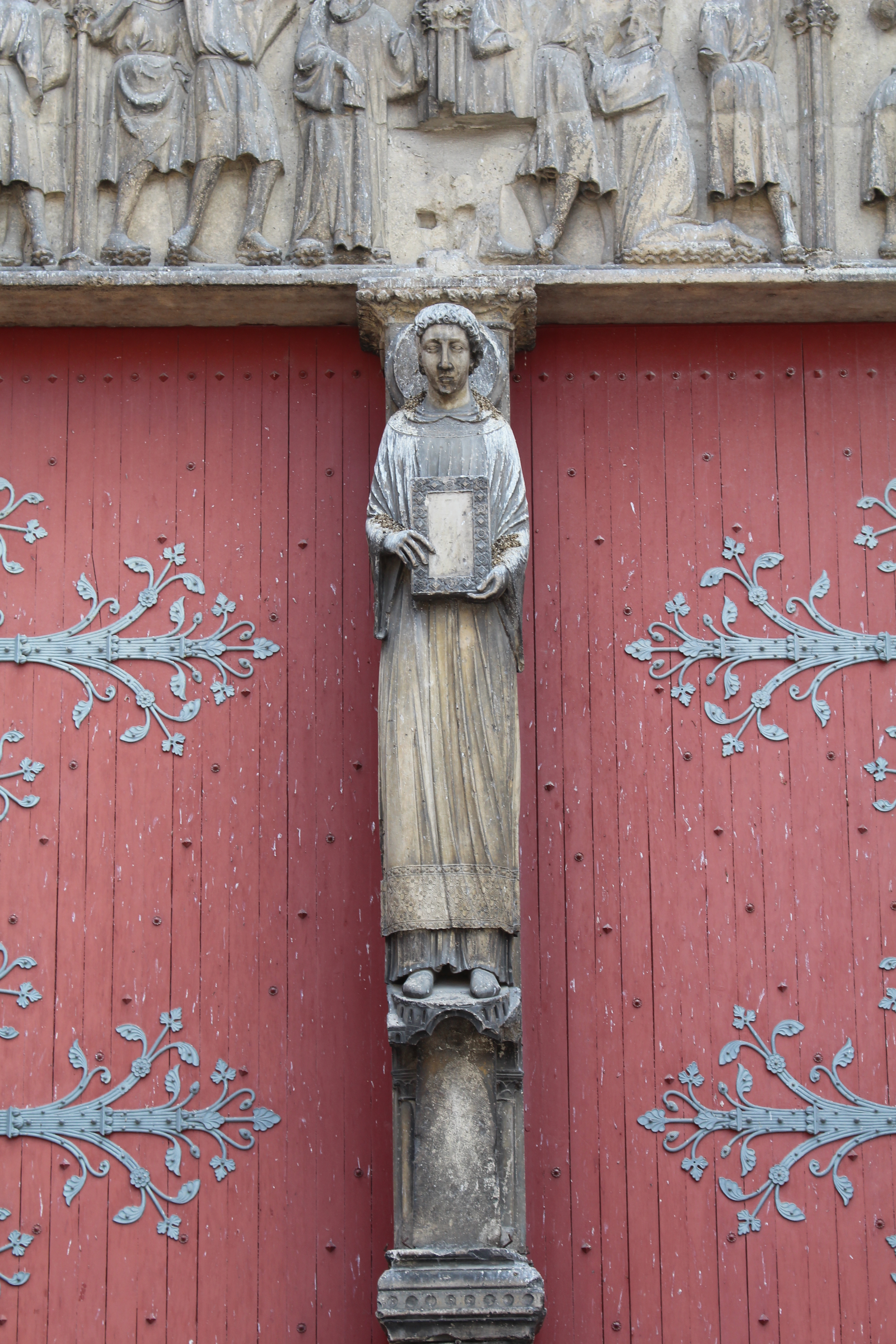
Statue-column of Saint Stephen, west facade (1190-1200)

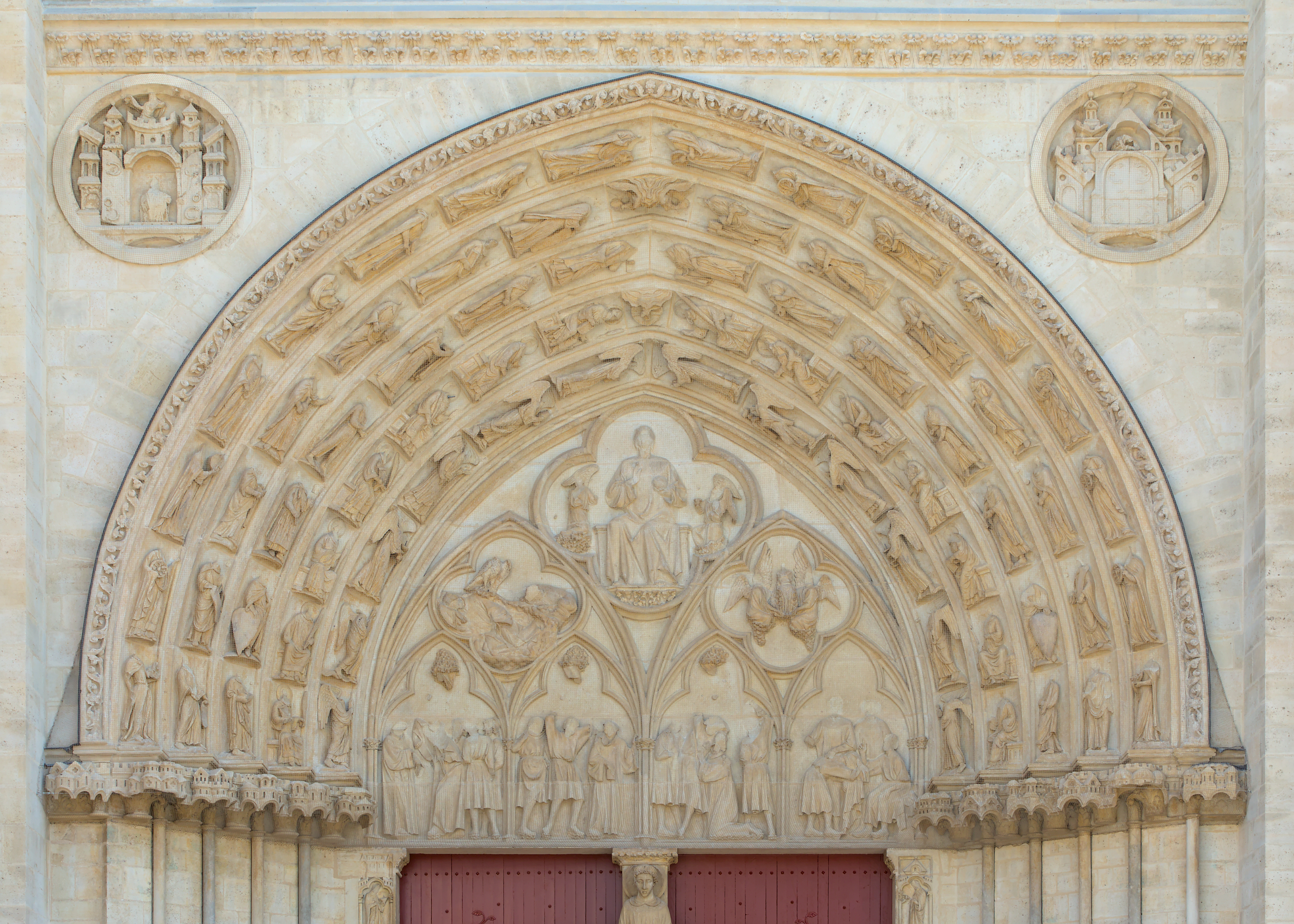
Tympanum of the life of Saint Stephen. The heads of most figures were knocked off during the French Revolution

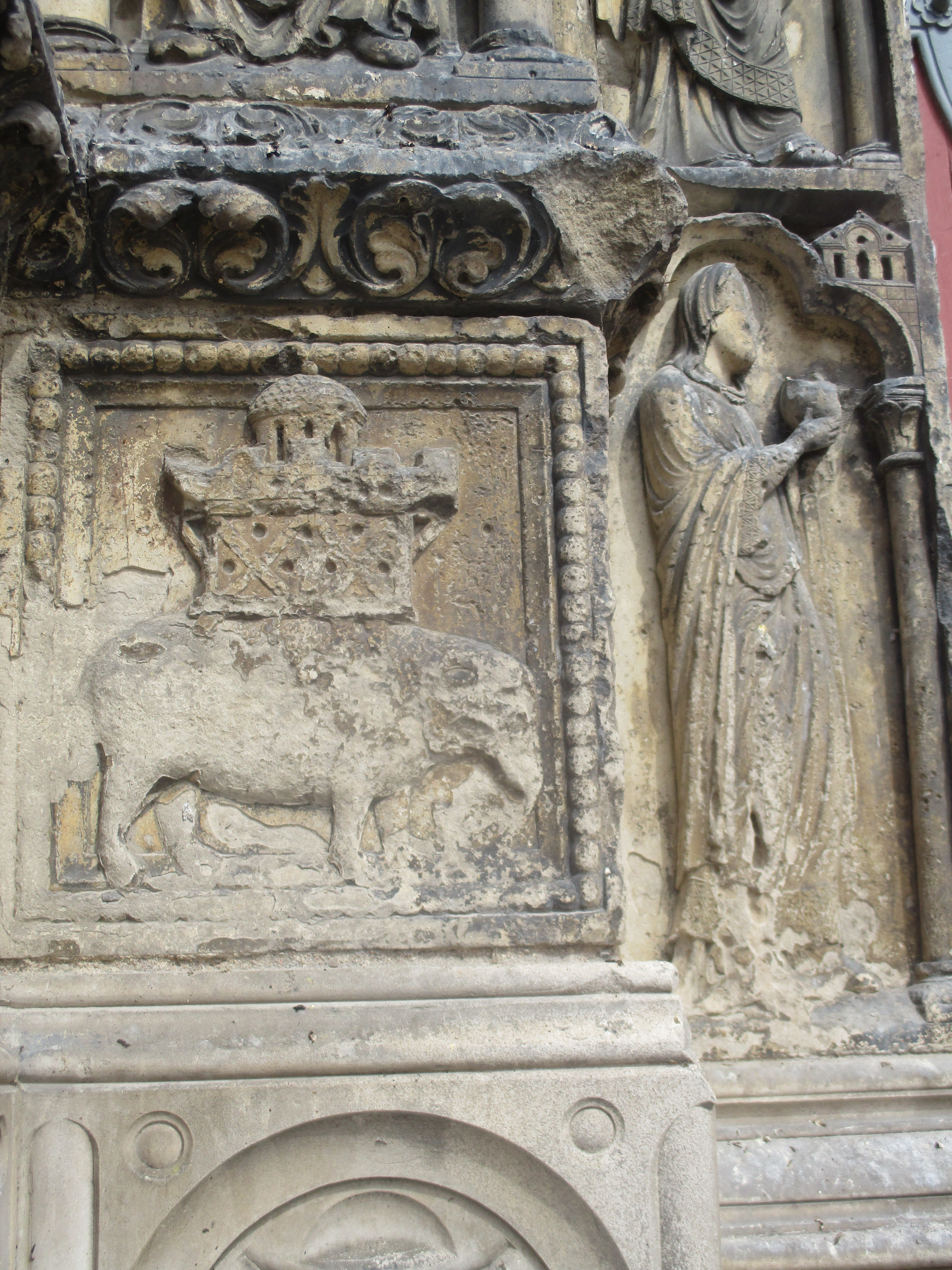
Exotic beasts - an elephant on the central portal of Saint Stephen

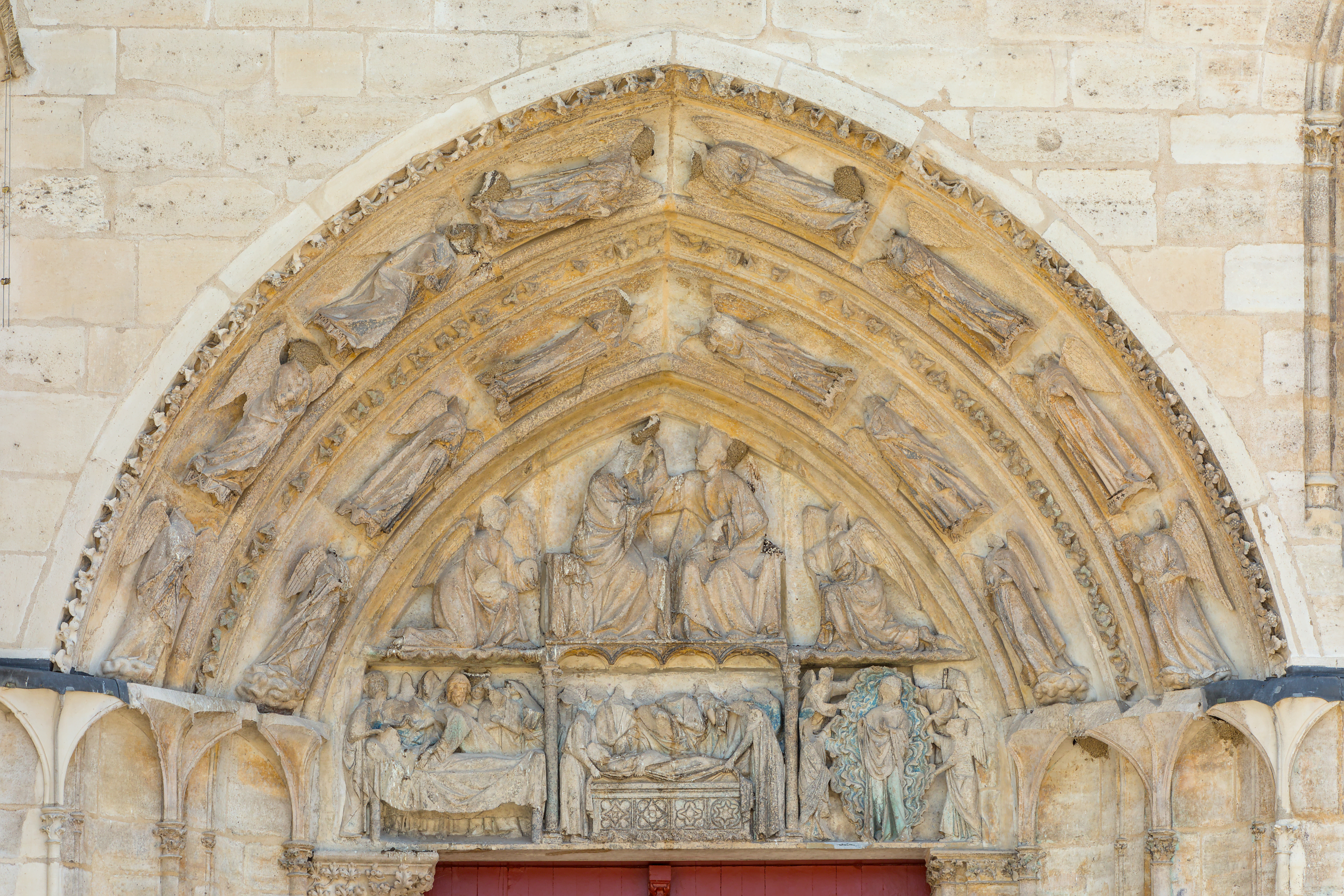
Tympanum of the portal of the Virgin Mary, west facade (1190-1200)

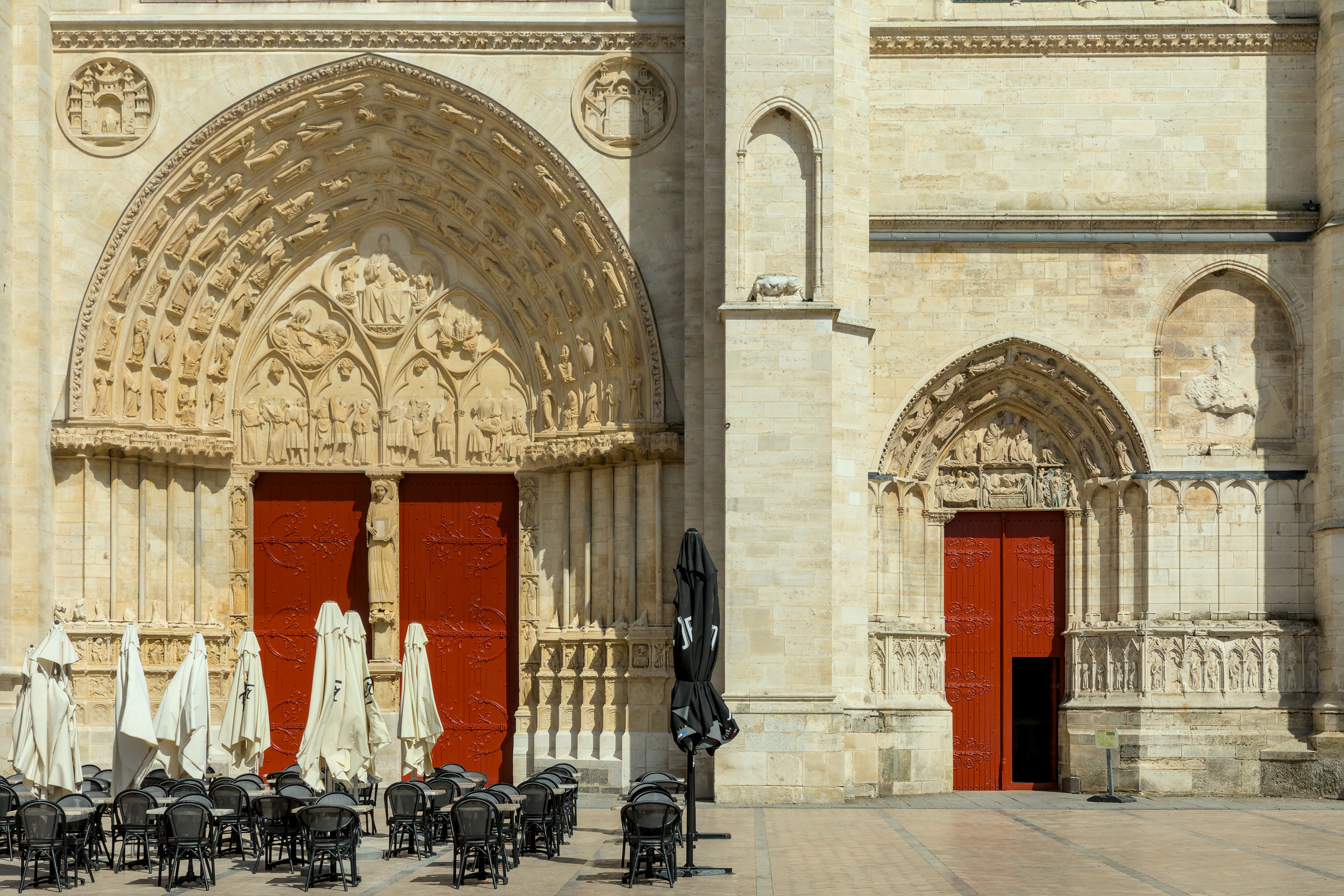
Portals of Saint Stephen and of the Virgin Mary

The west facade has three portals or doorways, which contain some of the oldest sculpture in the cathedral. Some of the sculpture was smashed during the French Revolution, and some original pieces, notably the column-statues and two bas-reliefs, have been moved to the museum within the Archbishop's palace, and replaced with copies. The portal on the north, dedicated to John the Baptist, is the oldest, made between 1190 and 1200, prior to the portals of Notre Dame de Paris and Chartres Cathedral. It is the best preserved, and is an exceptionally good example of the Early Gothic style. Its arched tympanum over the doorway is crowded with sculpted figures and events of the Saint's life. The central scene, just over the door, depicts Christ, in the water, being baptised by the Saint. Another scene depicts Salome, the nemesis of the Saint, carrying his head on a plate. Traces of paint were found on the sculpture, including red pigment on the neck of John the Baptist and gold on the cup of Salomé, indicating that, as with other Gothic cathedrals, the entire tympanum was brightly coloured.

The central portal is aligned with the altar, and is dedicated to Saint Stephen, the patron saint of the cathedral with events of his life. His statue occupies the column between the two doors, and was the only one of the statue-columns that survived the Revolutionary battering. (The statue in place is a copy – original is now inside the museum). Besides statuary representing Parable of the Ten Virgins and the story of St Stephen, it presents sculptures of animals, including ostriches, elephants and dolphins, as well as mythical beasts including basilisks and griffons. It also illustrates the typical activities of each of the twelve months, including harvesting crops and making wine. Many of these works were badly damaged during the Revolutionary vandalism. The sculpture on soubassements, or lower portions of the portal, contain sculptural figures illustrating the arts and sciences of the Middle Ages, including Grammar, Dialectics, Rhetoric, Music, Mathematics, Astronomy and Philosophy.

The South portal on the west facade is dedicated to the Virgin Mary, and the tympanum illustrates her life. It is the most recent, probably from the end of the 13th century. It replaced the original portal, which was destroyed in 1268 by the fall of the south tower.

== Transept ==
South Facade, portal of Moses and flamboyant rose window (15th–16th c.)

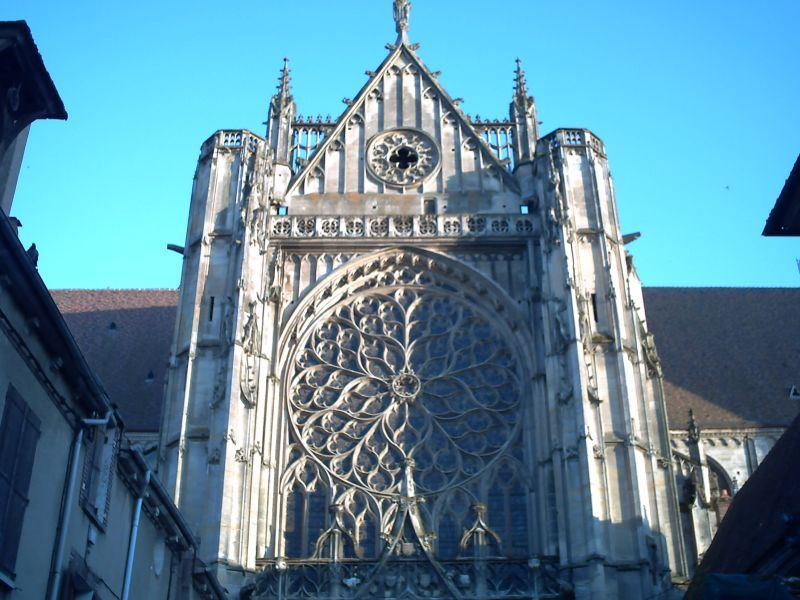
The flamboyant north transept rose window (1503–1507)

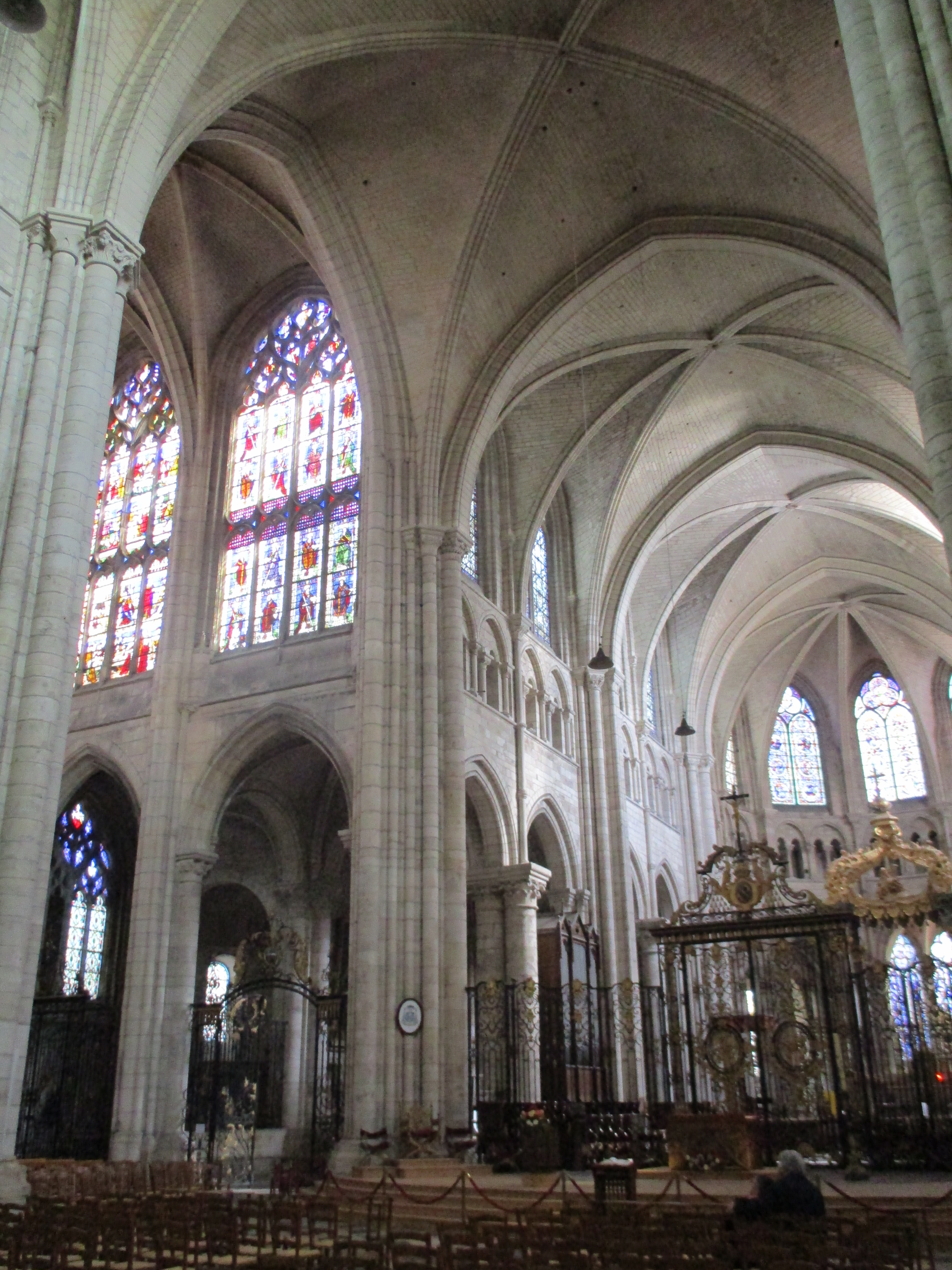
Intersection of the transept (left) with high windows and the choir (late 15th – early 16th c.)

The transept of the cathedral was constructed at the end of the 15th and beginning of the 16th century in the Flamboyant style. It was the work of architect Martin Chambiges, who also designed the transepts of Senlis Cathedral, Beauvais Cathedral (1499), and the west front of Troyes Cathedral (1502–1531). The portal of the south transept was reserved for the Archbishop, whose residence faced it across the courtyard. The north portal was reserved for the clergy of the Chapter.

The Flamboyant style is most vividly expressed in the curving pointed archway over the portal of Moses, topped by a statue of Moses with the tablets of the Ten Commandments. Above is a group of narrow lancet windows, below the south rose window, which is filled with the flamboyant twists and counter-twists of stone tracery. This facade is flanked by two pinnacle-like towers, which contain stairways and are topped with elaborate spires. The stairways are marked with the fleur-de-lis emblem of Louis X of France and the ermine, symbol of his wife, Anne de Bretagne. There are many niches for sculpture above the doorway, but the statues were destroyed in the Revolution.

The north transept portal, called the Portal of Abraham, also designed by Martin Chambiges, had an even more elaborate flamboyant rose window and facade, it was as built between 1503 and 1507. The statuary here was also destroyed in the Revolution.

== Stained glass ==
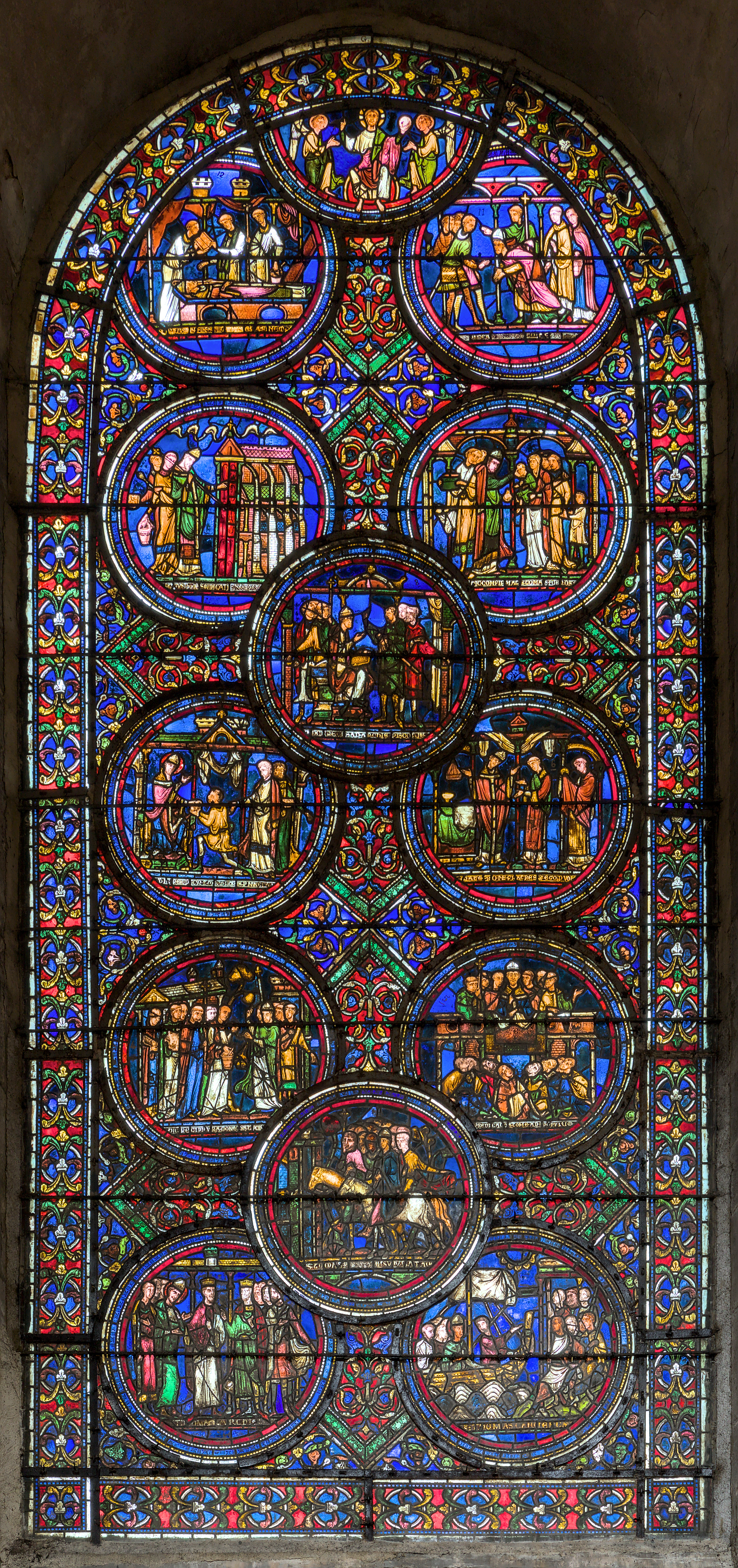
The Thomas Becket window (early 13th century)

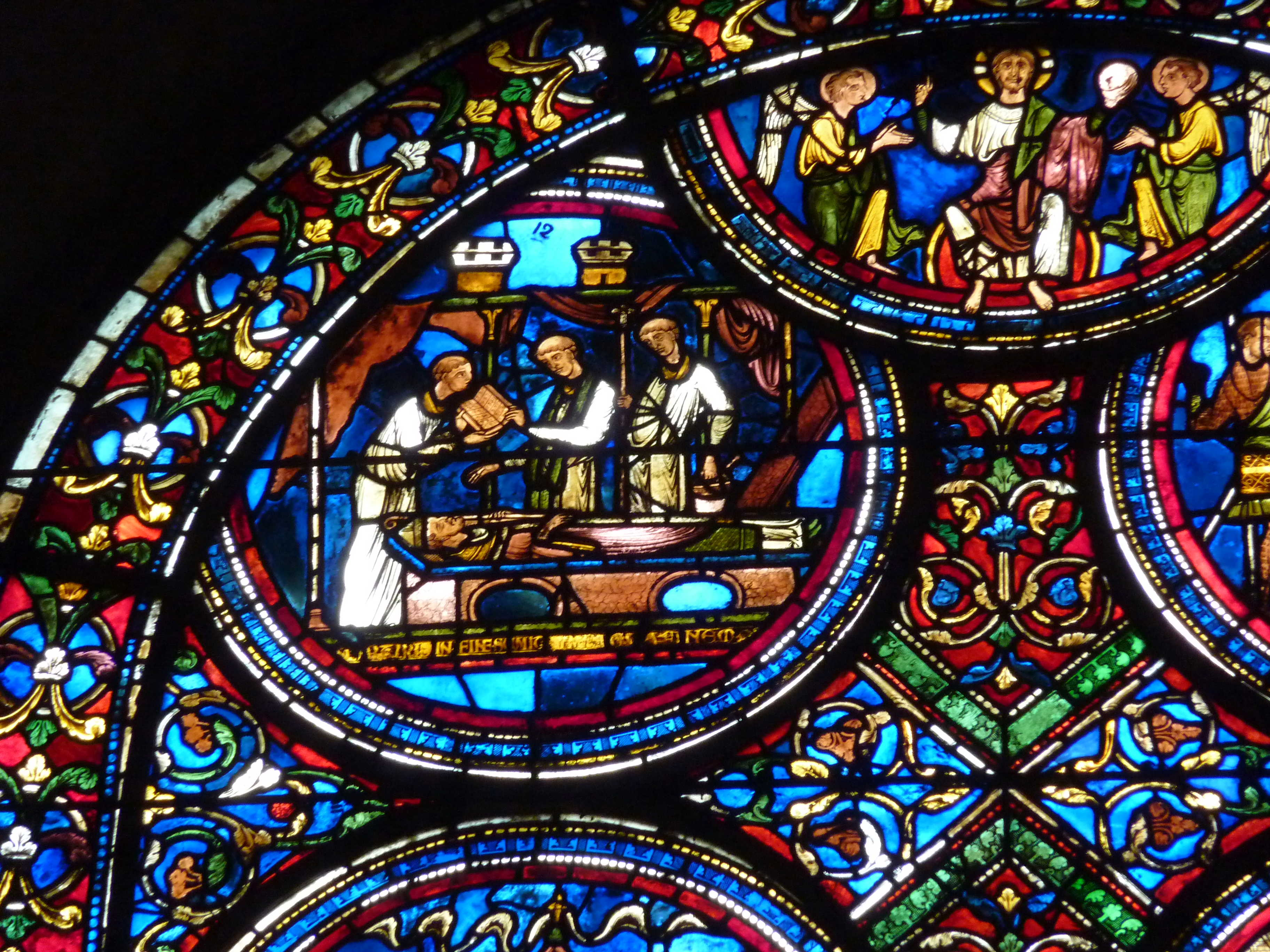
Detail of the Thomas Becket window. Burial of the Saint. (13th c.)

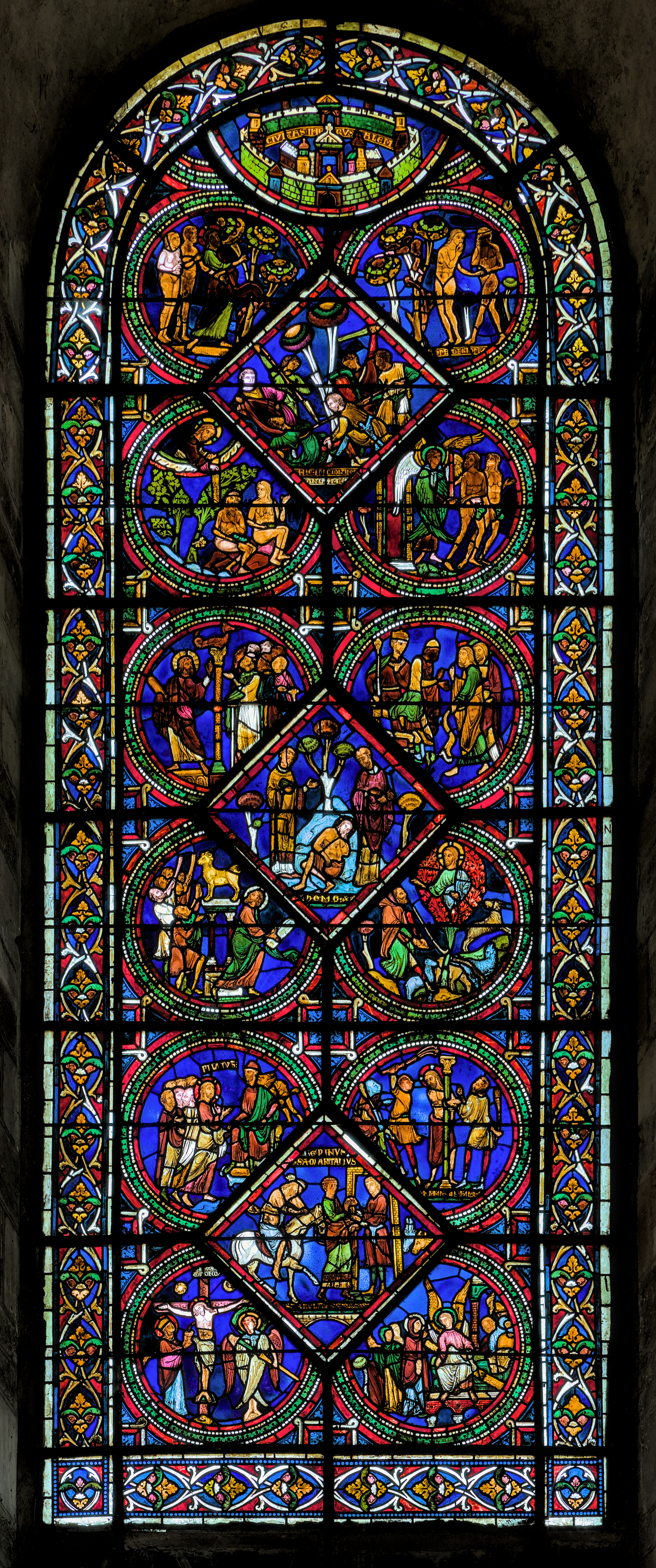
The Good Samaritan Window, Bay 15 (Early 13th c.)

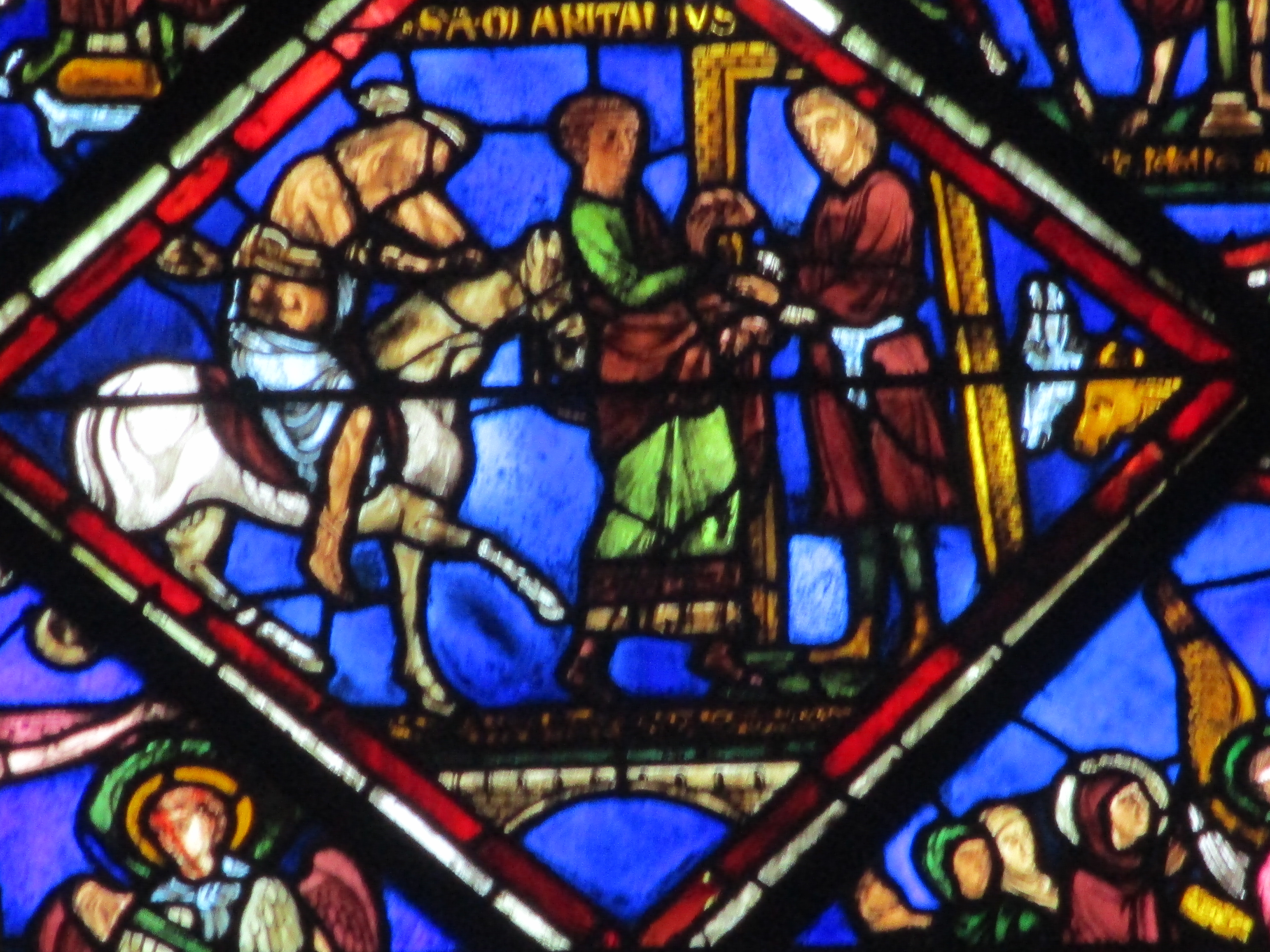
The Good Samaritan (Early 13th century)

Sens Cathedral has an important collection of stained glass windows covering the periods from the Early Gothic to the Renaissance. The oldest stained glass, from the early 13th century, is found in the upper windows of the choir and in the apse. The best-known is the Thomas Becket window, celebrating his life and martyrdom. The others present the stories of the Good Samaritan, and the Prodigal Son These windows date from 1200 to 1205, and are located in the north collateral of the choir. They are composed of circular and triangular medallions of stained glass, illustrating episodes in the lives of their subjects.

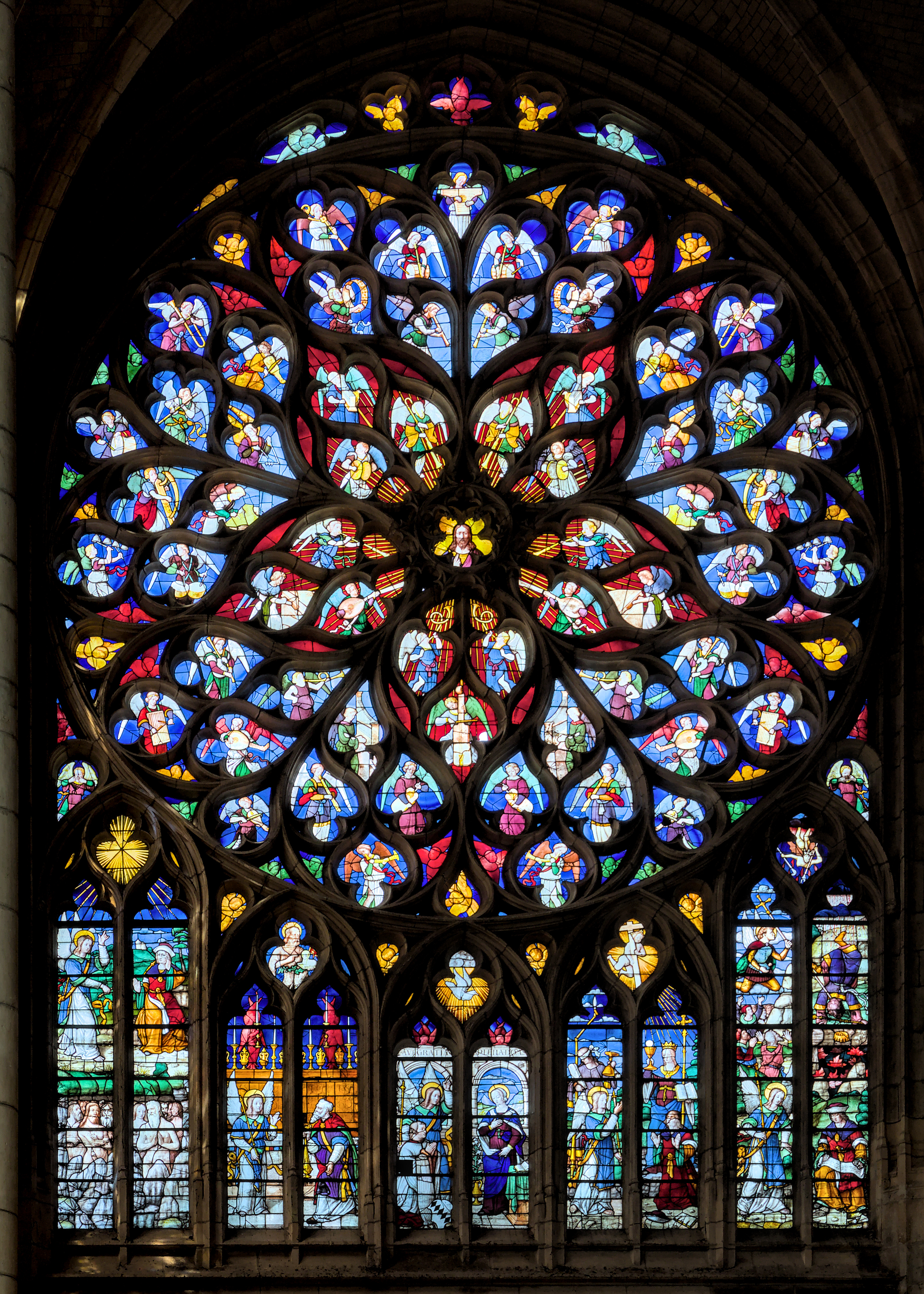
The north rose window (16th century)

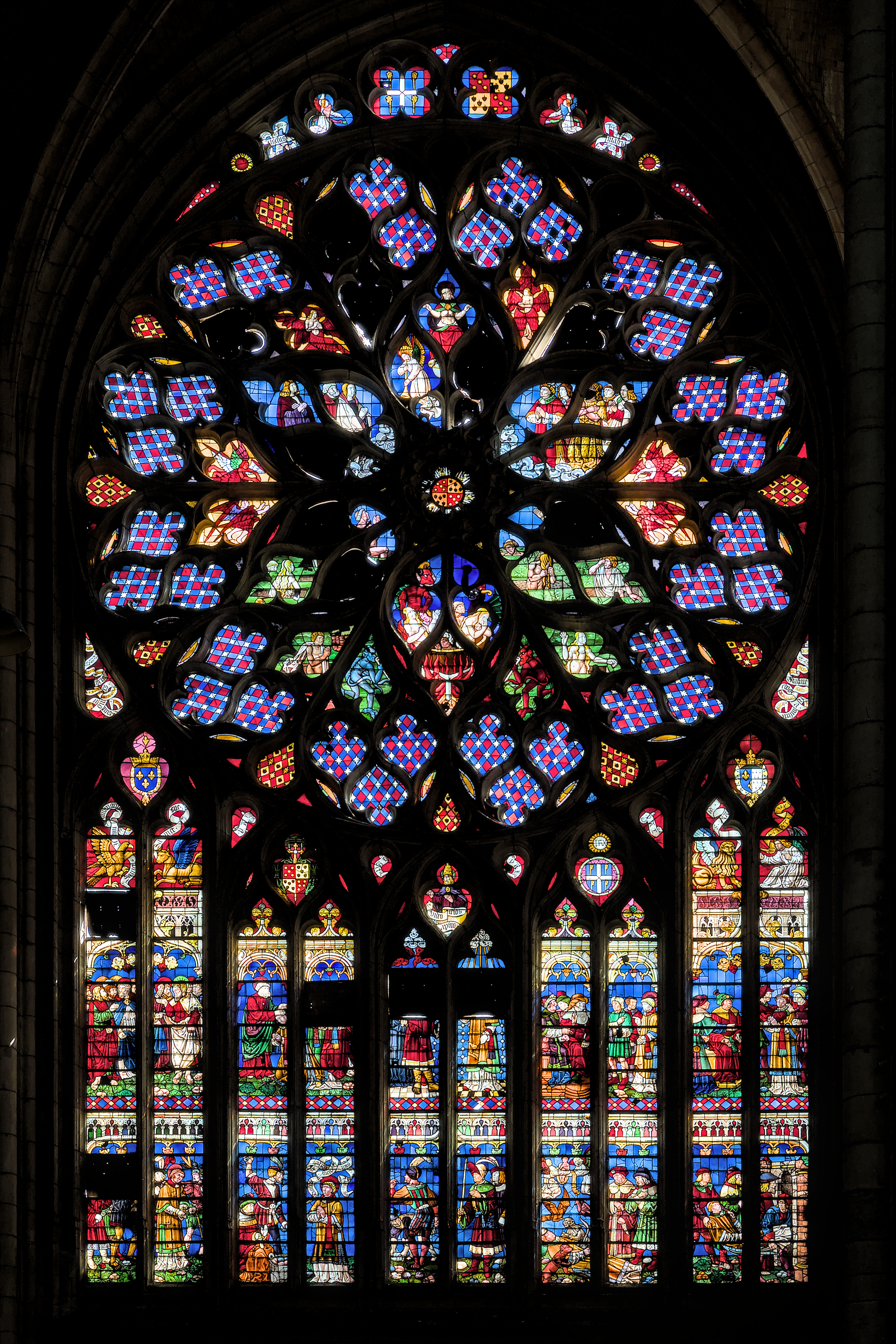
The south rose window

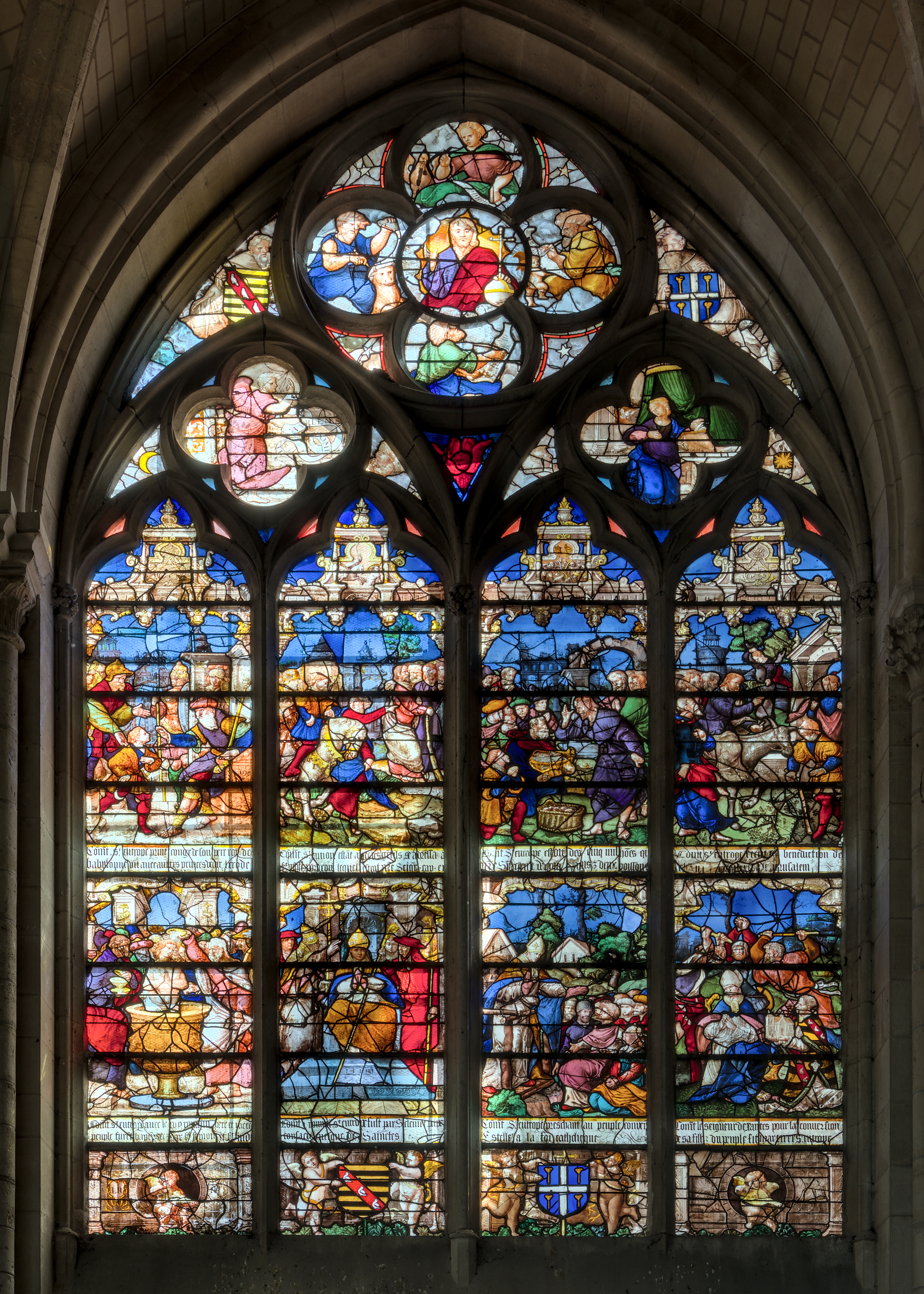
16th century window (bay 34)

The rose windows in the transept are from the 16th century and are good examples of the late Flamboyant Gothic style. The realism and use of three dimensions in the late windows shows the growing influence of the Renaissance.

== Sculpture ==
The Virgin and Child sculpture is known particularly for her serene expression and the fine detail of the drapery. It was given to the church by the Canon Manuel de Jaulnes in 1334. Like most statues of the Virgin, it was spared destruction during the French Revolution, though the decoration of the crown was broken off, and later restored.

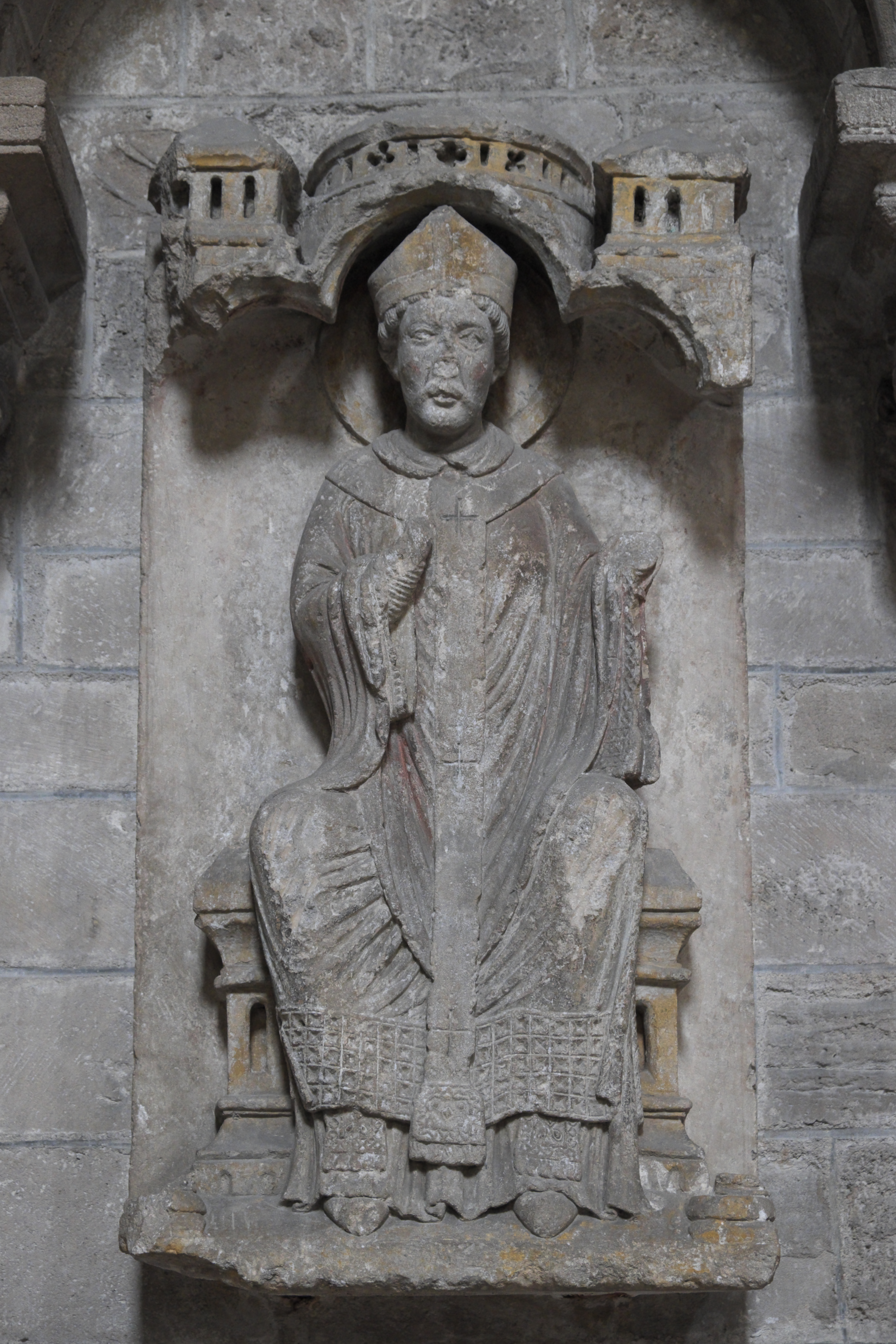
Sculpture of Thomas Becket (c. 1180), north ambulatory

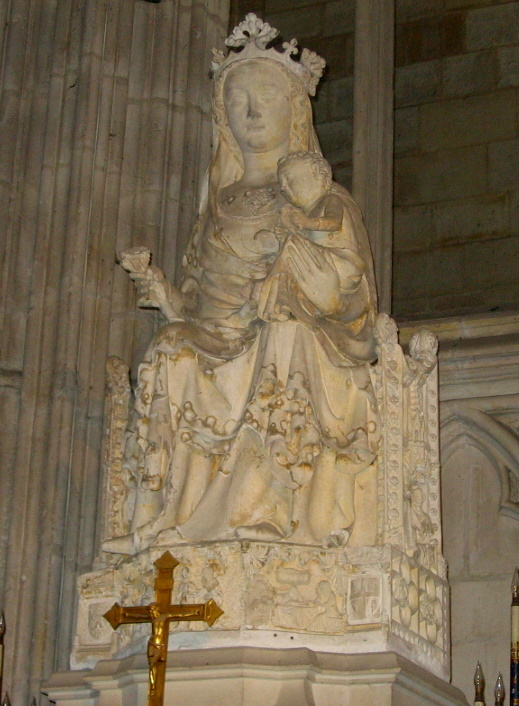
Virgin and Child (14th century), by Manuel de Jaulnes (1334)

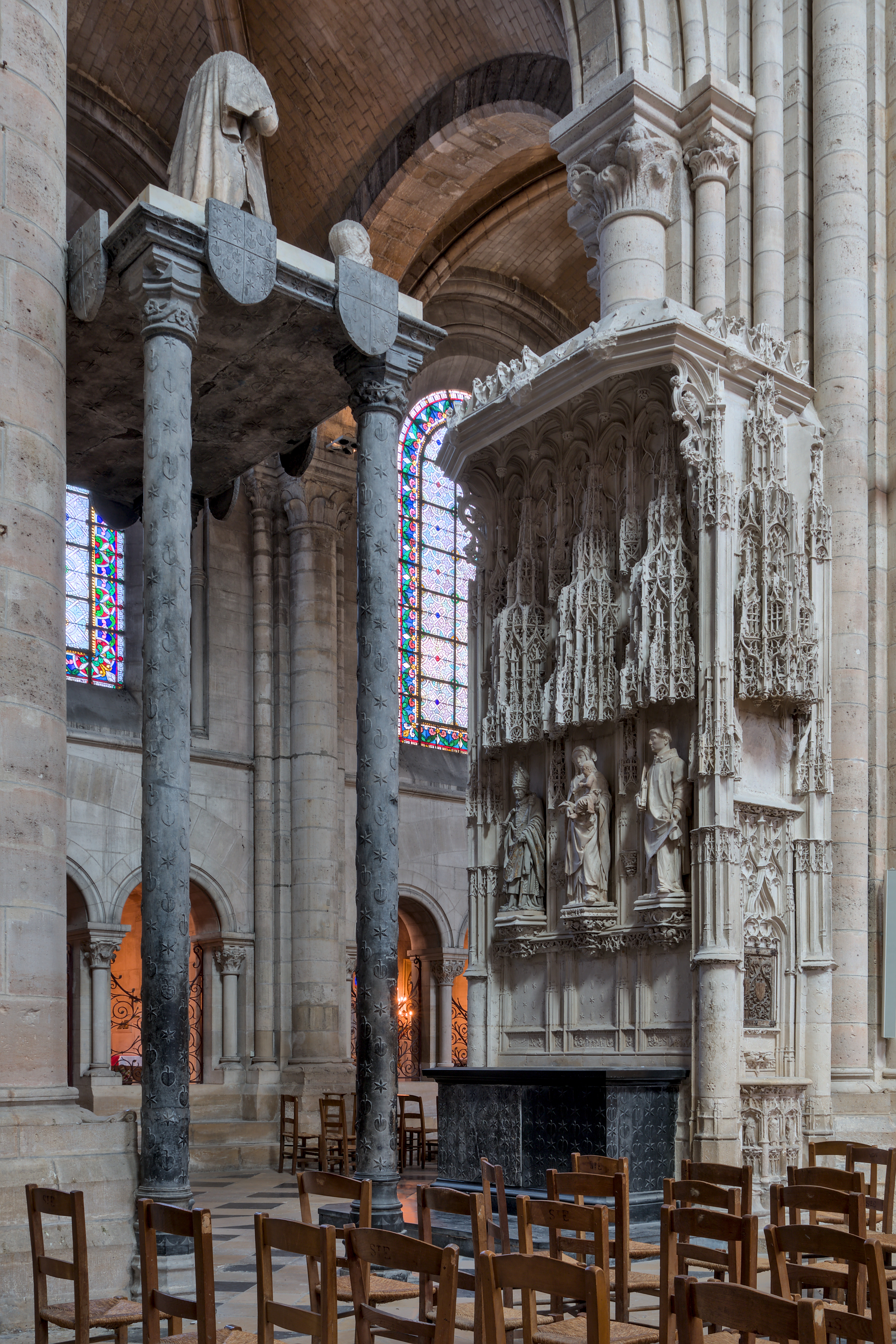
Retable of the Salazars (1514)

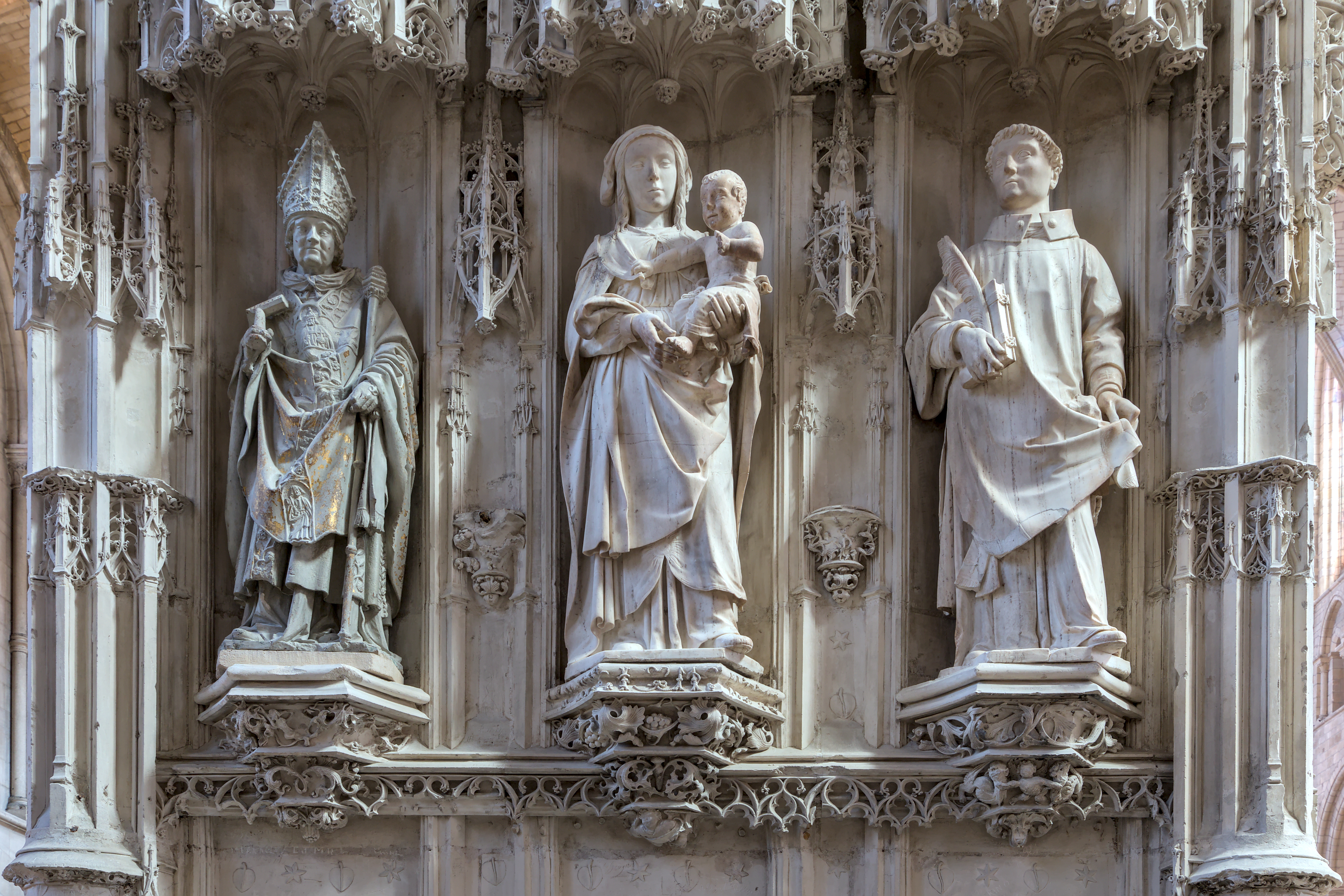
From the retable of the Salazars (1514)

The Chapel of the Salazars was created by the Archbishop Tristan de Salazar (1474–1519) to honour his parents. It contains a baldaquin facing an altar of black marble, on four pillars, with a retable above it. The altar was made beginning in 1514 by Guillaume Chavelveau. The sculpture on the retable illustrates the religious history of Sens and of the Salazars. It includes sculpted images of John the Baptist, Saint Stephen, a Virgin and Child, and eight statues of prophets and sibyles. The intricate decoration and lace-like spires are in the Flamboyant Gothic style. The work was consecrated in 1516 by the donor himself.

The Martyrdom of Saint Severin was made in the 18th century by the sculptor Joseph Hermand, the royal sculptor for the King of Poland and Duke of Lorraine, Stanislas Leczinski. The dramatic scene of the martyrdom is set against a screen of pale yellow stucco, resembling drapery.

The tomb of the Louis, Dauphin of France (son of Louis XV), and his consort, Marie-Josèphe of Saxony, who died of tuberculosis in 1765 at the age of 36, is located in the cathedral. His wife died eighteen months later of the same disease. Though he was never King of France, he was the father of three French Kings: Louis XVI, Louis XVIII, and Charles X. The sculpture is by Guillaume Coustou the Younger.

Other Prominent works of sculpture and bas-relief represent scenes from the life of Cardinal Antoine Duprat, chancellor of France and archbishop of Sens from 1525 to 1535. The mausoleum from which they came was destroyed in the French Revolution.

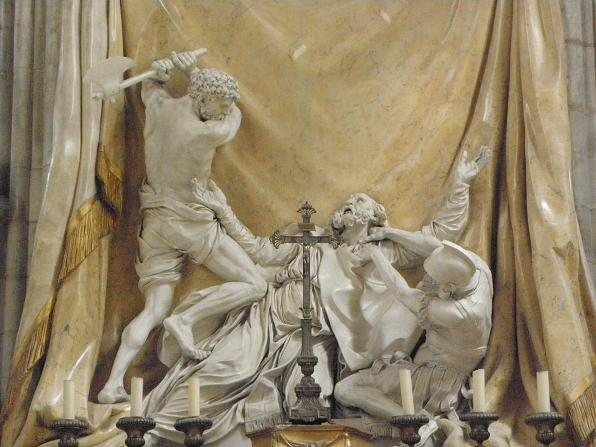
The martyrdom of Saint Severin, by Joseph Hermand

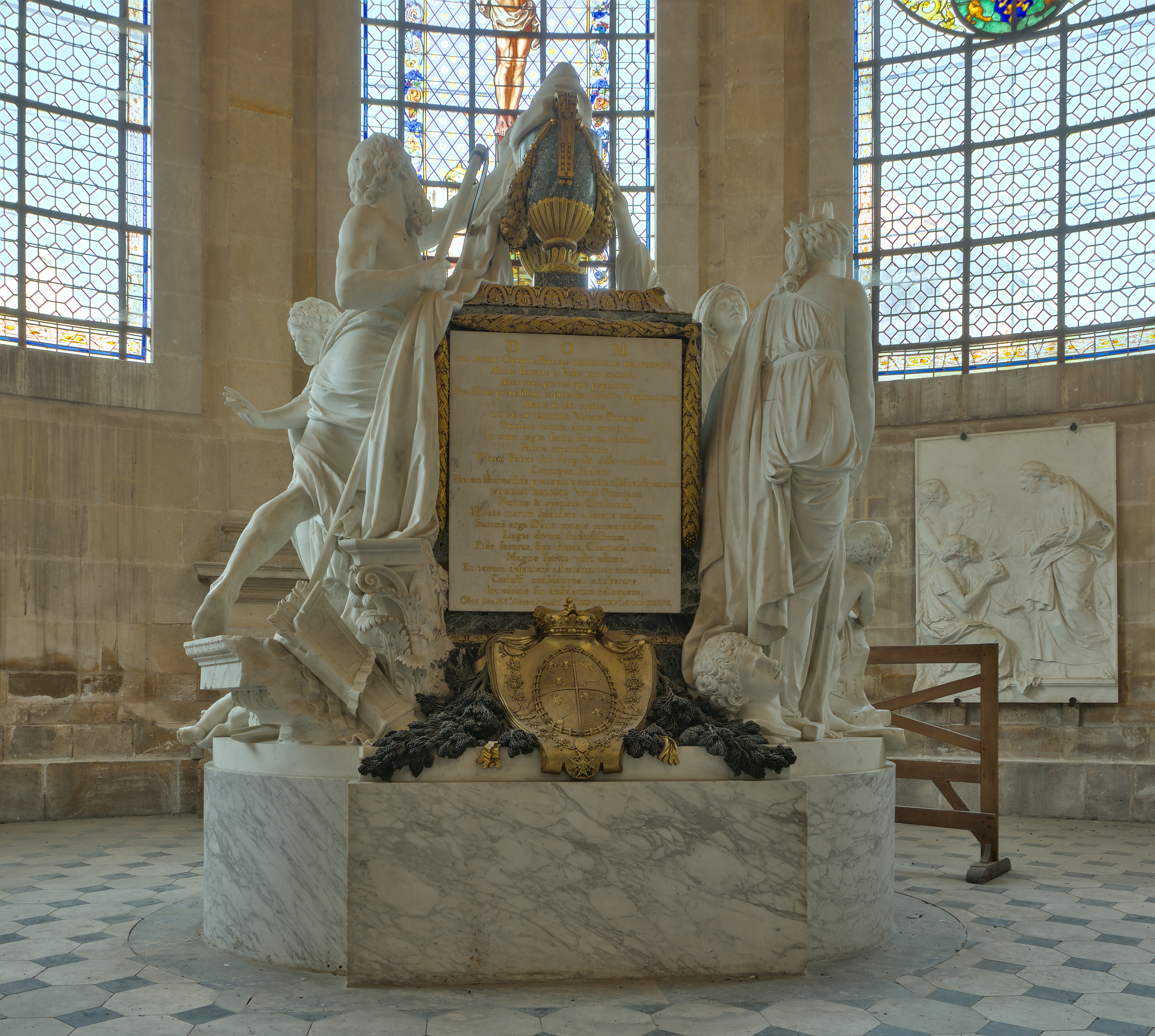
The Tomb of Louis, Dauphin of France and Marie-Josèphe of Saxony

== Baldaquin and choir grill ==
In 1740 the Archbishop Jean-Joseph Languet de Gergy decided that the cathedral needed a grander altar and a baldaquin, a high canopy over the altar, to participate in the Artistic counter-Reformation campaign against the more austere Protestants. The function of the baldaquin was to attract the eyes to the altar. The new work was designed by the Chevalier Jean Nicolas Servandoni, architect of the King, and two sculptors, the Slodtz brothers. Servandoni was particularly known for designing opera scenery settings for the spectacles and festivities of the King, as well as a few church interiors.

The main elements of the Baldaquin are the four marble columns, each five meters high, which came from Rance. They originally were made to surround the statue of Louis XIV in Place des Victoires, but were removed in 1718. The old altar was demolished beginning in 1742, and the remains of the earlier Bishops and clergy, buried beneath the floor, were relocated. The columns were placed upon pedestals to make them even higher, and crowned with gilded bronze Corinthian capitals, which support the gilded canopy. The centerpiece of the canopy is a gilded sunburst design with a tetragramme, the four letters of the name of God in Hebrew, YHWH. The gilded crown at the top was inspired by that made by Bernini for the altar of St. Peter's Basilica in Rome.

The marble of the original altar, consecrated in 1332, was incorporated into the new altar. The altar originally had a celebrated golden table, which was removed and melted down to raise money during the reign of Louis XV. At the summit of the baldaquin is a bronze statue of an angel, two meters (six feet) high, holding a crucifix in one hand and a chain in the other, attached to a silver pavilion holding a chalice, or cup, a symbol of the ceremony of the Eucharist.

The nave, intended for the public, and the choir, intended for the clergy, were originally separated by a stone screen. with a single doorway. The choir was surrounded by an iron grill. The screen and old grill deteriorated, and in 1726 the Chapter decided to replace it with a new, more ornate screen, with the coat of arms of the Chapter and a crucifix. The work did not begin until 1760, with a new design and an abundance of gilding. The gateway to the choir was particularly ornamented with twisting sculpture resembling grapevines, the symbol of the Eucharist. On top of the gate is the coat of arms of the Cardinal de Luynes, composed of chains of gold and lions. The earlier, simpler grill, made in 1726, was moved to the Chapel of Saint Savinien, where it remains today.

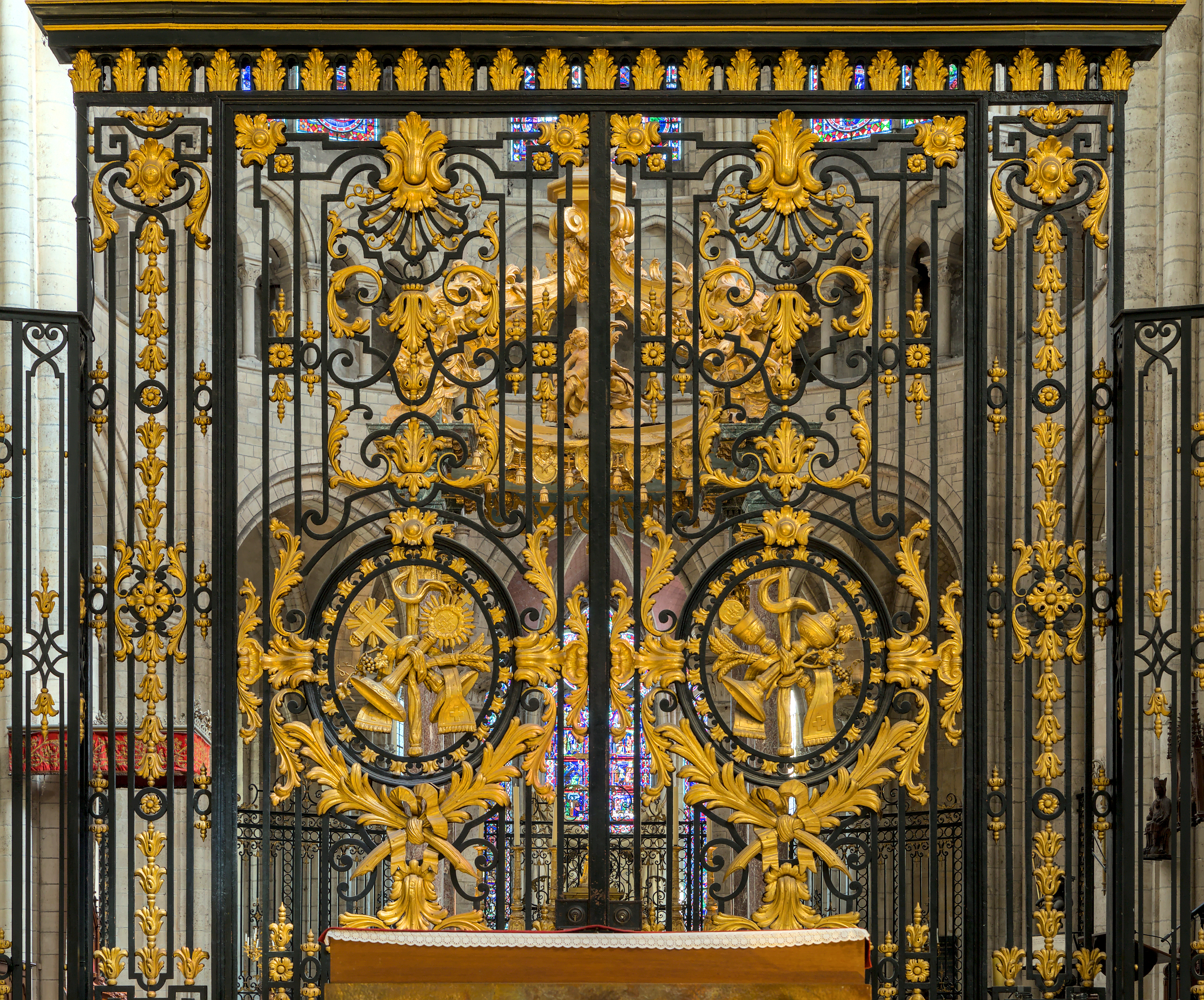
Details of the choir screen (18th century)

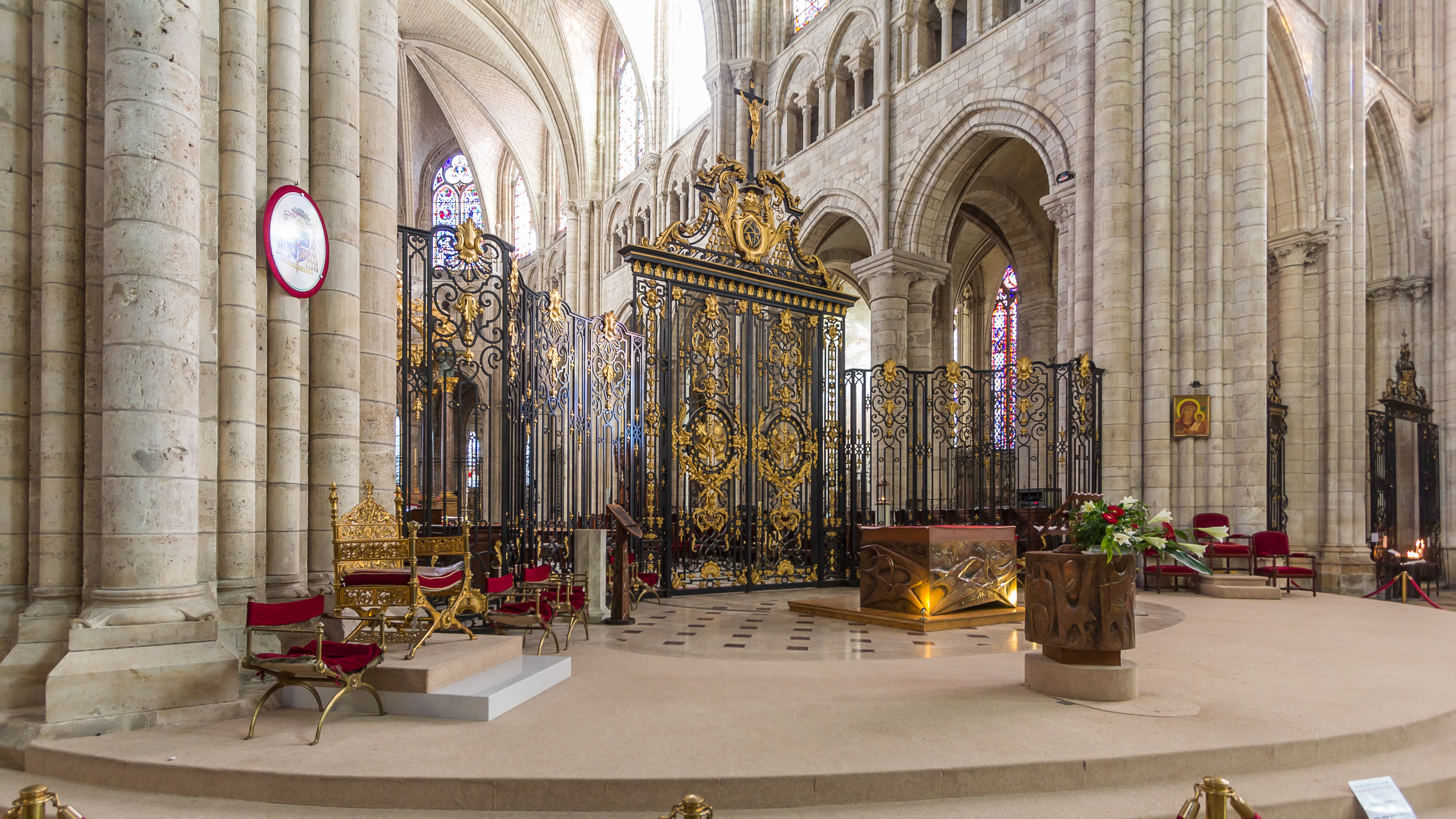
The choir screen, altar, and Archbishop's chair

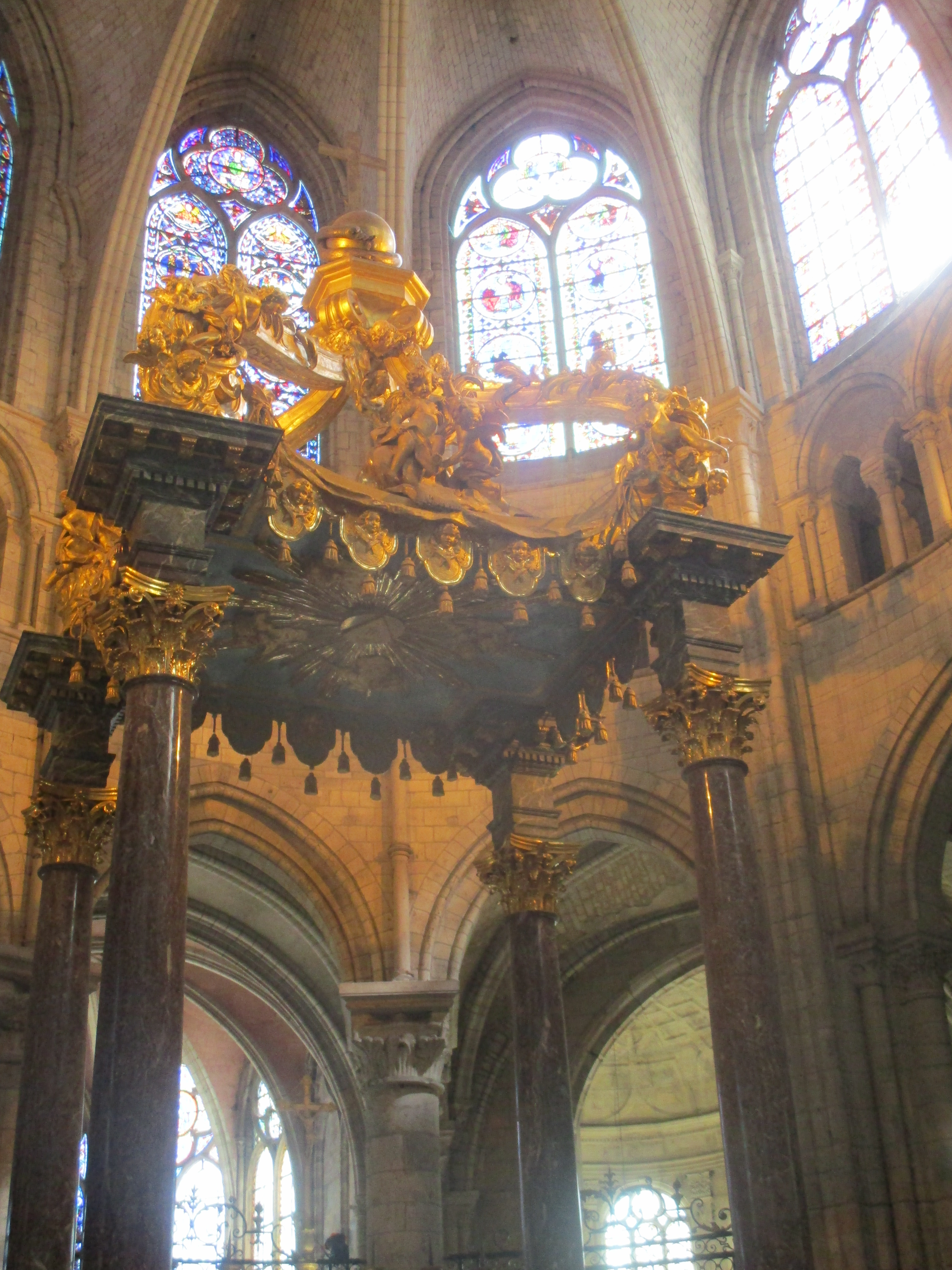
The Baldequin over the main altar (18th century)

== Organ ==
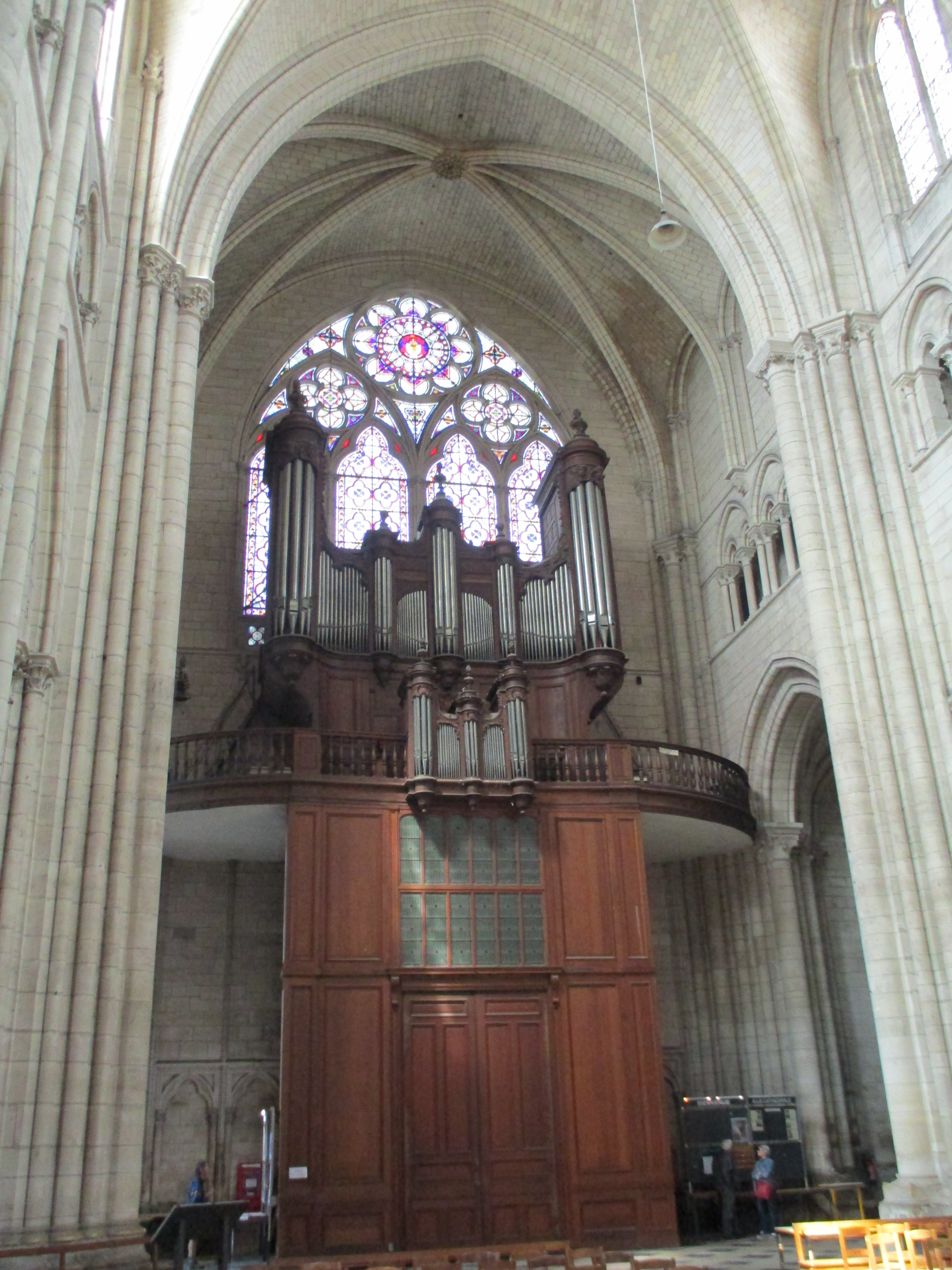
The cathedral organ (18th-19th c.)

The pipe organ at Sens Cathedral was used in medieval times to play only during interludes; the chanting by the clergy was unaccompanied. The earliest mention of an organ in the cathedral was in 1440. Records show a new organ with twelve pedals was installed in purchased 1560, and was enlarged in 1609. A new, larger instrument, more in keeping with changes in church music, was ordered in 1722, and installed for Easter 1734 near the entrance of the nave, on the inside face of the west facade. The new instrument could play 36 notes on its three keyboards, and an additional 29 notes with foot pedals, enlarged to 34 notes in 1774.

Following the Revolution, when the cathedral was secularised, the organ was used only rarely, for festivals celebrating the Supreme Being. In 1802 the cathedral was returned to Catholic Church. The organ was fragile and sensitive to humidity, and in need of restoration. The composer Charles Gounod came to the cathedral in 1886 and asked to see the organ, which was then hardly playable. He launched a campaign for its restoration, which was finally done in 1890. It underwent another restoration in 1978. Today it has 878 pipes from the 18th century, and an additional 24 from the 19th century, for a total of 2,906 pipes. A second, less powerful organ was installed in the choir in 1841 to accompany the singers.

== The Treasury and the Sens Museum ==
The Archbishop's residence, adjoining the cathedral, now displays the cathedral treasury, and also houses the history museum of the city of Sens, with an important collection of Gallo-Roman antiquities. The Palace was built in the 13th century, with further additions made in the 16th and 17th centuries. It was restored by Viollet-le-Duc in the 19th century.

The treasury includes a large collection of objects used in celebrating mass in the cathedral, including crosses, reliquaries, chalices, rings, and a very ornate reliquary made for Charlemagne for a purported fragment of the True Cross. It also includes clerical vestments, including a hat, robes and shoes worn by Saint Thomas Becket during his time in Sens.

The lower level of the Sens Museum features a reconstruction of a Roman thermal bath, with a large mosaic floor eleven meters by nine meters. The baths were discovered beneath the gardens of a nearby residence, and were excavated and reassembled in the museum in 1910. The central element is a depiction of the legend of the chariot of the sun, after the fall of Phaeton.

The museum has a very diverse collection, including a painting by Pieter Brueghel the Younger, a sculpture by Rodin, and Art Deco furniture from the workshop of Raymond Subes, who provided furnishings for the ocean liner Normandie.

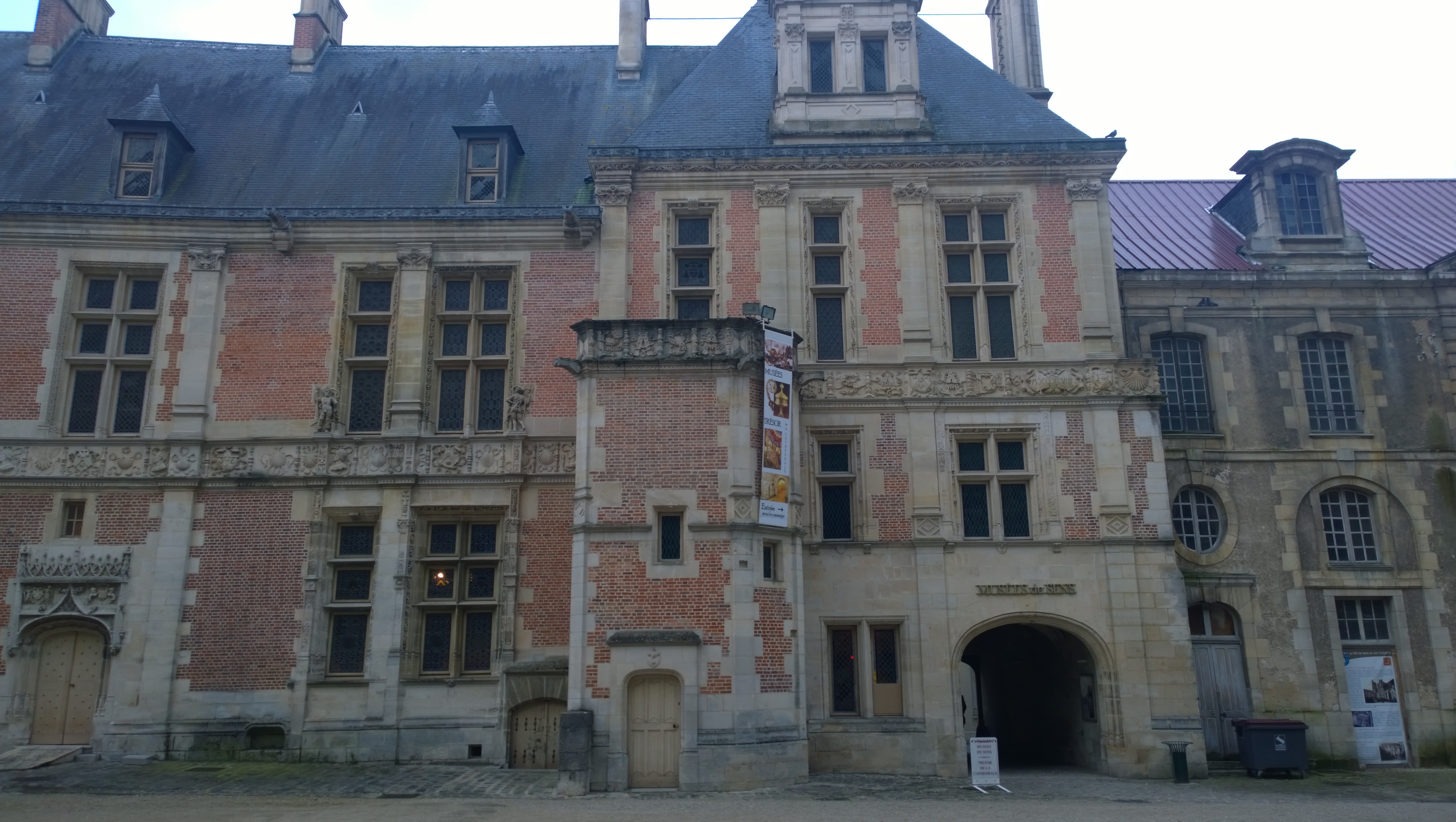
The Archbishop's Palace, Sens

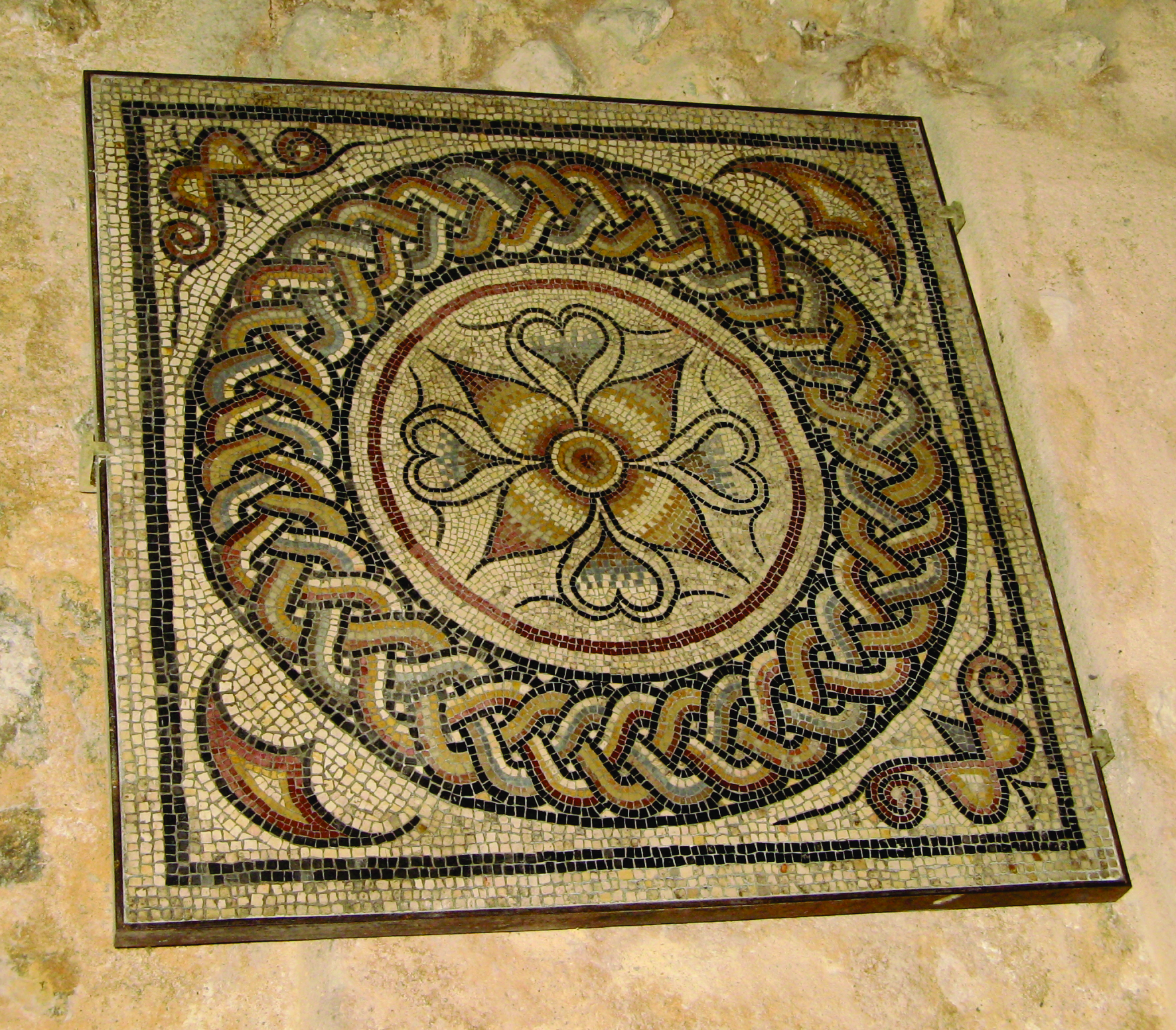
Gallo-Roman mosaic in the Sens Museum

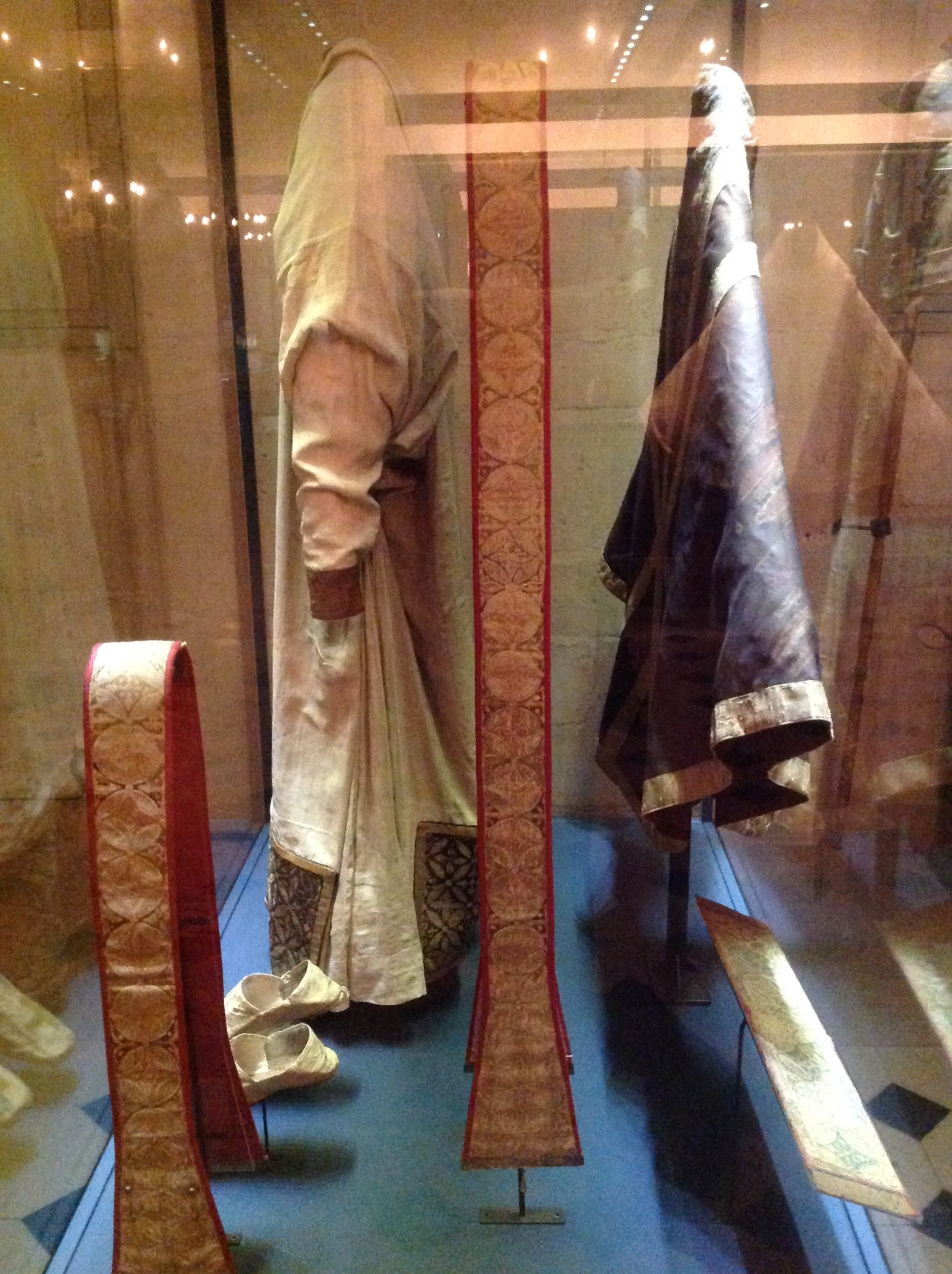
Liturgical garments of Thomas Becket (12th century)

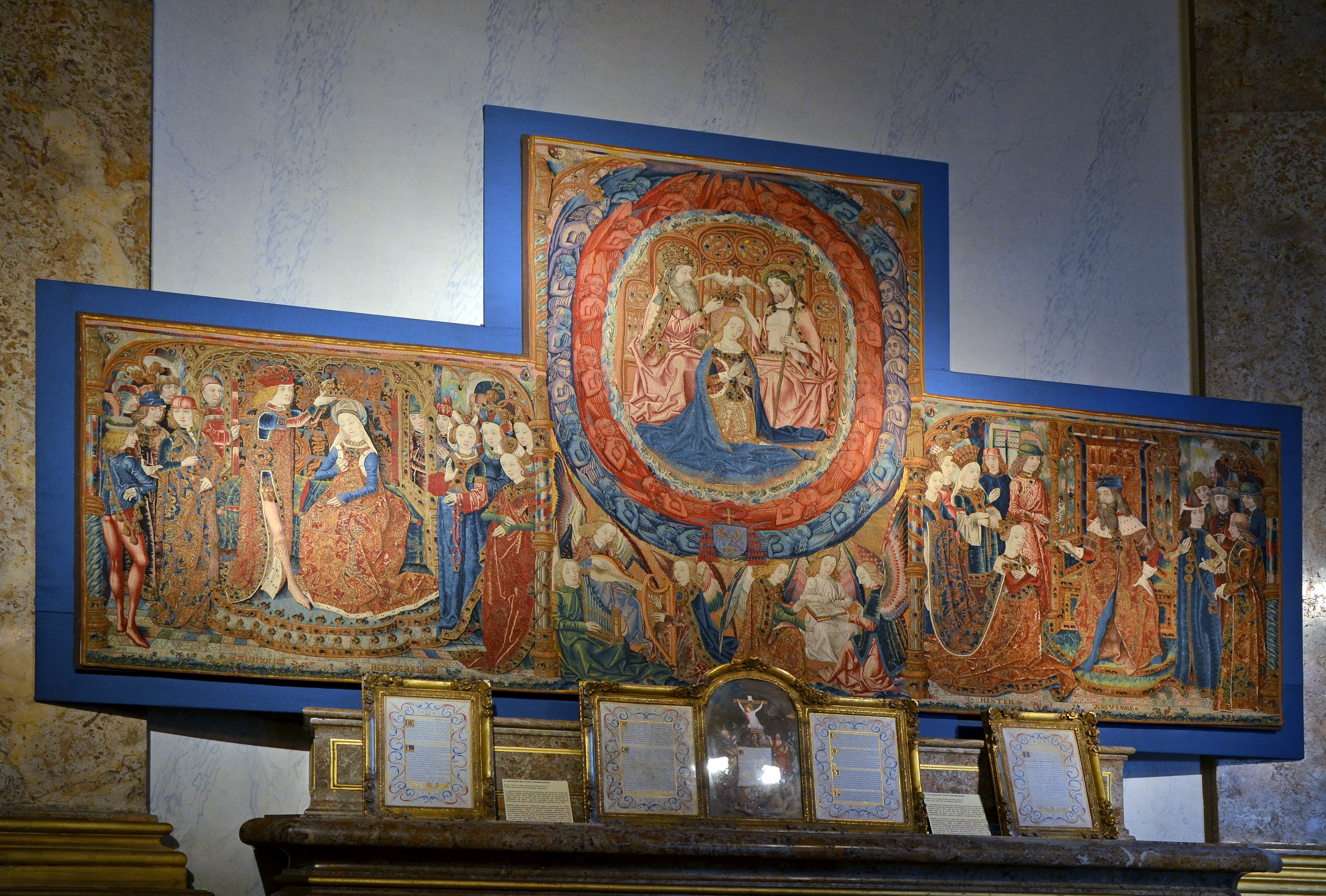
"Crowning of the Virgin" – 15th century tapestry altar covering in the Sens Museum

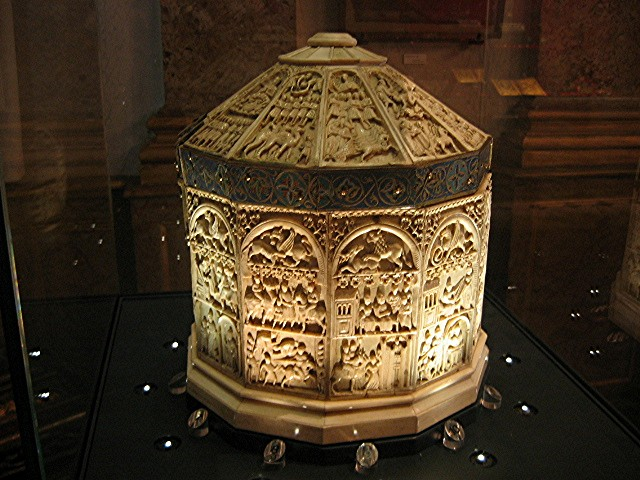
The "Sainte Chasse", with Biblical hunting scenes and mythical creatures; wood and ivory (12th century)

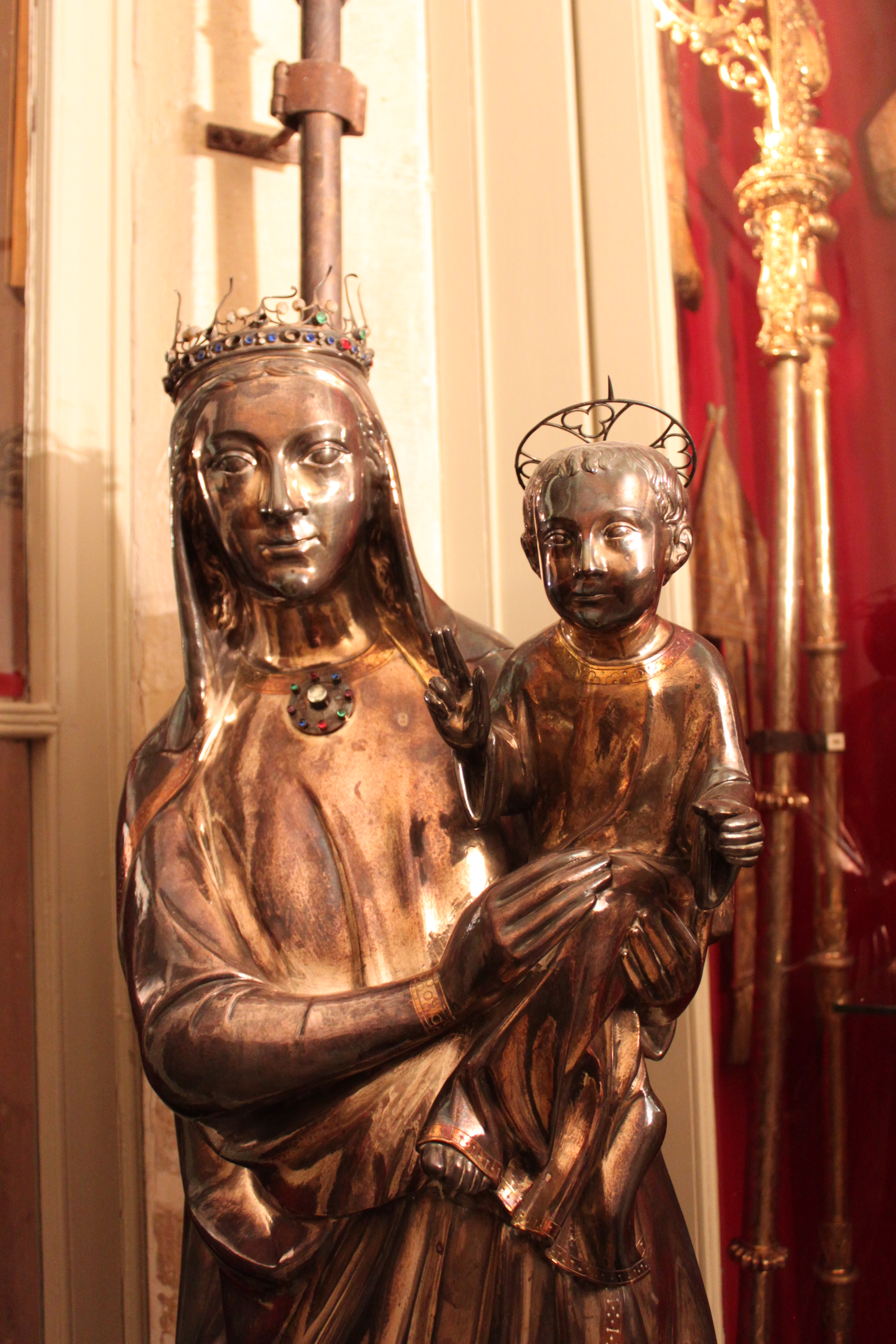
The Virgin and Child

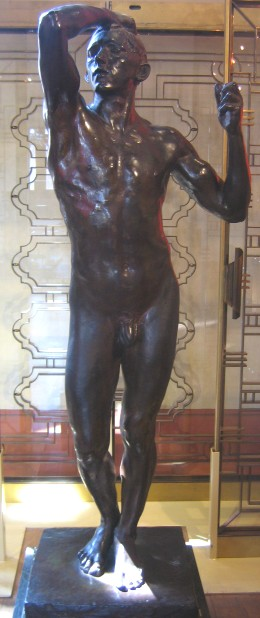
"The Age of Bronze" by Auguste Rodin (1877)

== See also ==
- French Gothic architecture
- Gothic cathedrals and churches
- French Gothic stained glass windows

== Sources ==
- Brousse, Bernard (2014). Sens - Première cathédrale gothique (in French). Garches: À propos. ISBN 978-2-9153-9813-7.
- Lours, Mathieu (2018). Dictionnaire des Cathédrales (in French). Editions Jean-Paul Gisserot. ISBN 978-2-755807-65-3.
- Mignon, Olivier (2015). Architecture des Cathédrales Gothiques (in French). Éditions Ouest-France. ISBN 978-2-7373-6535-5.
- Plein, Irene (2005). Die frühgotische Skulptur an der Westfassade der Kathedrale von Sens. Münster: Rhema-Verlag. ISBN 978-3-930454-40-2.
- Théodore Tarbé, Description de l'église métropolitaine de St-Etienne de Sens: recherches historiques et anecdotiques (Sens: The author, 1841).
- Eugène Vaudin, La cathédrale de Sens et ses trésors d' art (Paris: Champion 1882).
- G. Julliot, Trésor de la cathédrale de Sens (Sens: Ch. Duchemin 1886).
- E. Chartraire, La cathédrale de Sens (Paris: Henri Laurensn n.d. but after 1914). English translation, 1926
- Lucien Bégule, La cathédrale de Sens (Lyon: Société anonyme de l'imprimerie A. Rey, 1929).
- Denis Cailleaux, L'oeuvre de la croisée de la cathédrale de Sens (1490-1517): un grand chantier ecclésiastique à la fin du Moyen Âge d'après les sources comptables (Thèse de doctorat : Art et archéologie : Paris 1 : 1994).
