= Jean-Simon de Champigny =

French prelate

Coat of arms of Jean Simon de Champigny

Jean Simon de Champigny (died 1502) was a French prelate who was Bishop of Paris from 1492 to 1502.

== Biography ==
Jean Simon de Champigny was the son of Jean Simon, Seigneur of Champigny-sur-Marne and Combeaux (probably modern-day Pontault-Combault), who had served in the Parlement of Paris, and Jeanne Chambon. His sister Marie was the mother of Antoine Sanguin, and grandmother of Anne de Pisseleu d'Heilly. After inheriting his father's seigneury, he repaired the family's castle in 1490.

Jean Simon de Champigny entered the service of Charles VIII of France, becoming a councilor in the Parlement of Paris, canon of Notre Dame de Paris, and Archdeacon of Soissons.

In 1492, Champigny was unanimously elected Bishop of Paris. Pope Alexander VI confirmed his appointment on 29 October 1492; Champigny took the oath of allegiance on 10 December 1492; and in 1494, he traveled to Sens, where he was consecrated by Tristan de Salazar, Archbishop of Sens, on 22 September 1494. Champigny made his solemn entry into Paris in February 1495.

As bishop, he held a synod on 7 May 1495. He also gifted a chapel to the Collège de Montaigu. He also helped to establish or reform several religious orders.

Champigny died of plague on 23 December 1502.

Catholic Church titles
Preceded by Gérard Gobaille	Bishop of Paris; 1492–1502	Succeeded by Étienne de Poncher
