= Hôtel de Sens =

Coordinates: 48°51′12″N 2°21′33″E

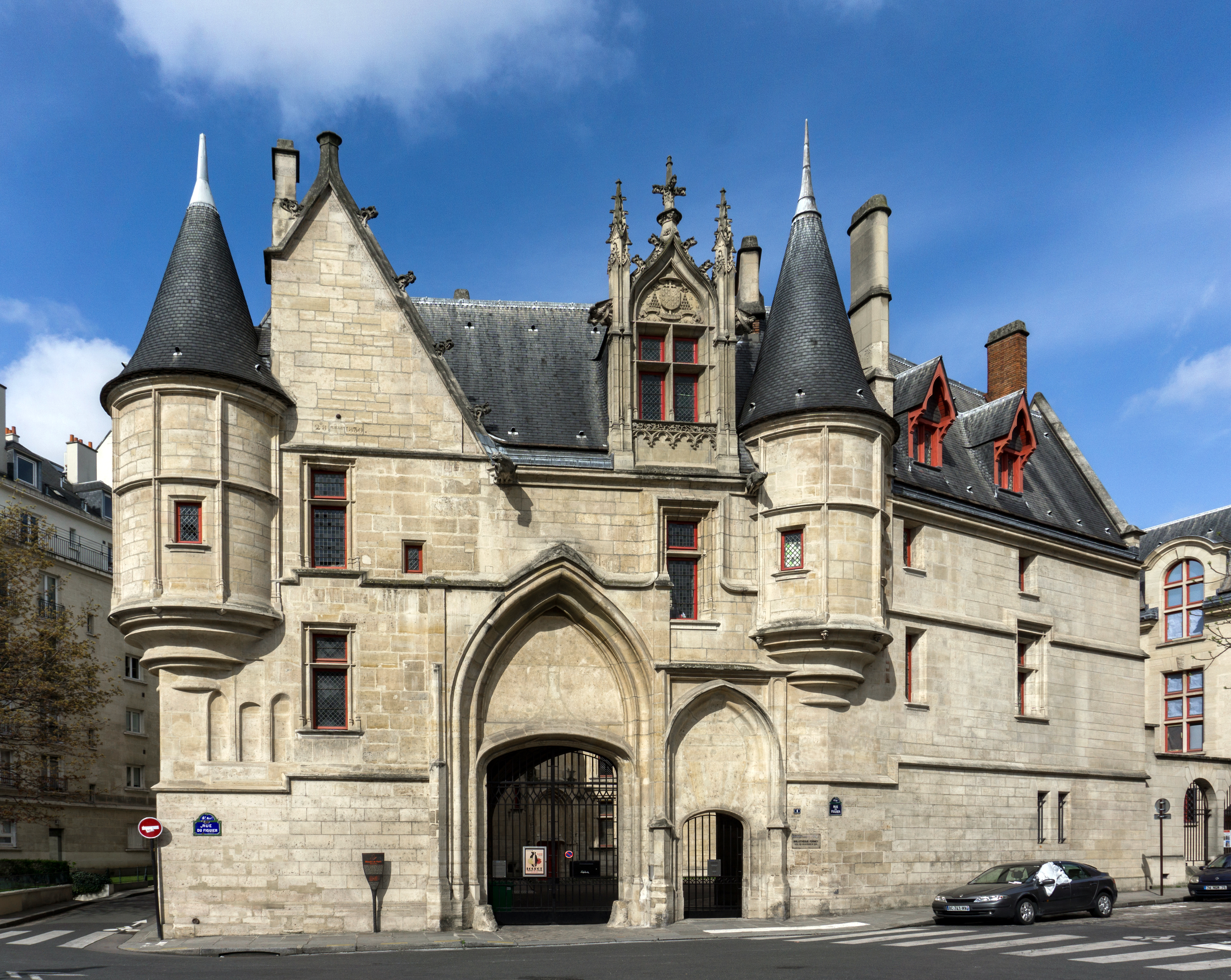
- Front façade
- Interactive map of the Hôtel de Sens area

General information
- Location: Paris, France

The Hôtel de Sens (French pronunciation: [otɛl də sɑ̃s]) or Hôtel des archevêques de Sens is a 16th-century hôtel particulier, or private mansion, in the Marais, in the 4th arrondissement of Paris, France. It nowadays houses the Forney art library.

== History ==
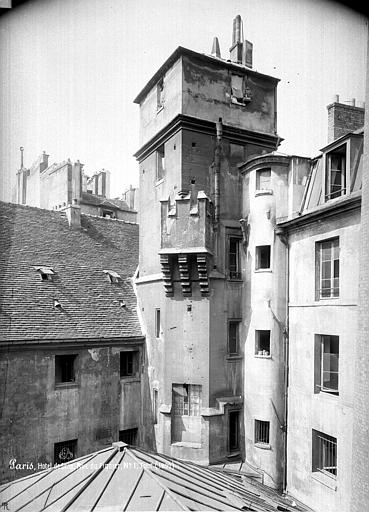
The tower before an early 20th-century reconstruction / embellishment campaign

The hôtel was built to serve as a residence for the archbishops of Sens. Before 1622, Paris was not an archdiocese, but rather a diocese suffragan to the Archdiocese of Sens. The archbishop was a prominent figure of power, his residence reflecting his influence within the urban landscape.

A first hôtel, at this location, was built for the archbishops of Sens in 1345, which was later used by Charles V, King of France, as a part of his royal residence, the hôtel Saint-Pol. When the Kings settled in the newly built Louvre palace, the building was destroyed, only to be replaced by the current hôtel, built between 1475 and 1519 by Tristian de Salazar and reinstalled as the residence of the archbishops of Sens. As such, it served as the house of many renowned prelates, such as Antoine Duprat, Louis de Bourbon de Vendôme, Louis de Lorraine, Nicolas de Pellevé (who died in the hôtel) or Jacques Davy Duperron. Margaret of Valois also lived there in 1605 and 1606, and her decision to cut down a fig tree (figuier) in front of the building that was impeding her carriage, is said to have inspired the name of the street, rue du Figuier.

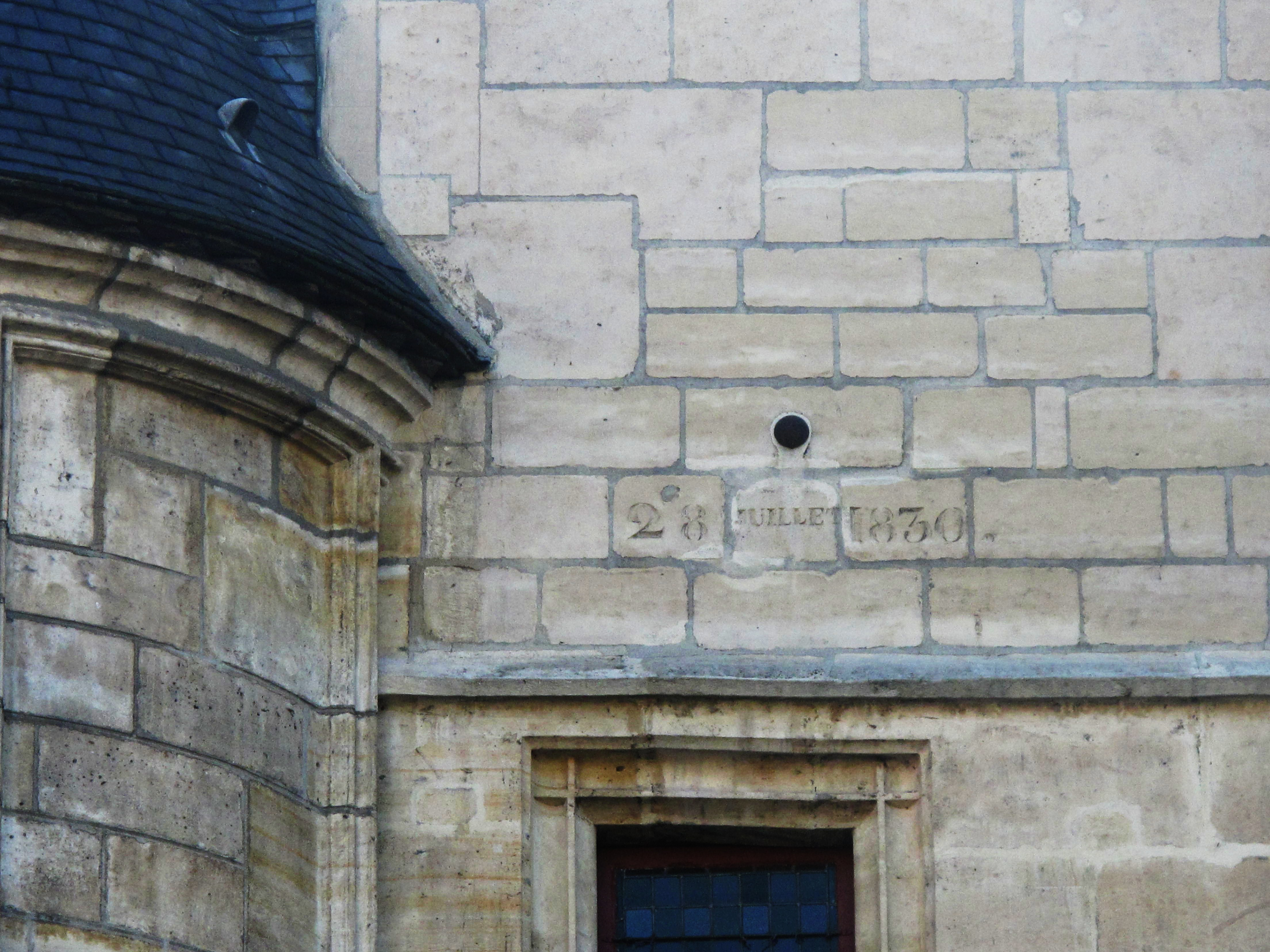
The 1830 cannonball lodged in the main facade.

In 1622, Paris became an archdiocese. The archbishops of Sens lost the major part of their power in the city, and their sojourns in Paris became progressively less frequent. The hôtel, transferred during the 17th century to the archdiocese of Paris, entered a lasting period of progressive decay. During the French Revolution it was confiscated as a bien national, sold in 1797 and privately owned throughout the 19th century, housing, like many hôtels particulier in the Marais at the time, shops, workshops or factories. During the Trois Glorieuses street fights of 1830, a cannonball hit the facade and lodged deep within the wall ; it is visible nowadays above the main entrance, the date engraved beneath.

Protected as a heritage site in 1862, the building was acquired by the city of Paris, and thoroughly restored in 1930. The Forney art library was installed in it in 1961.
