= Council of Sens =

The Archdiocese of Sens c. 1789

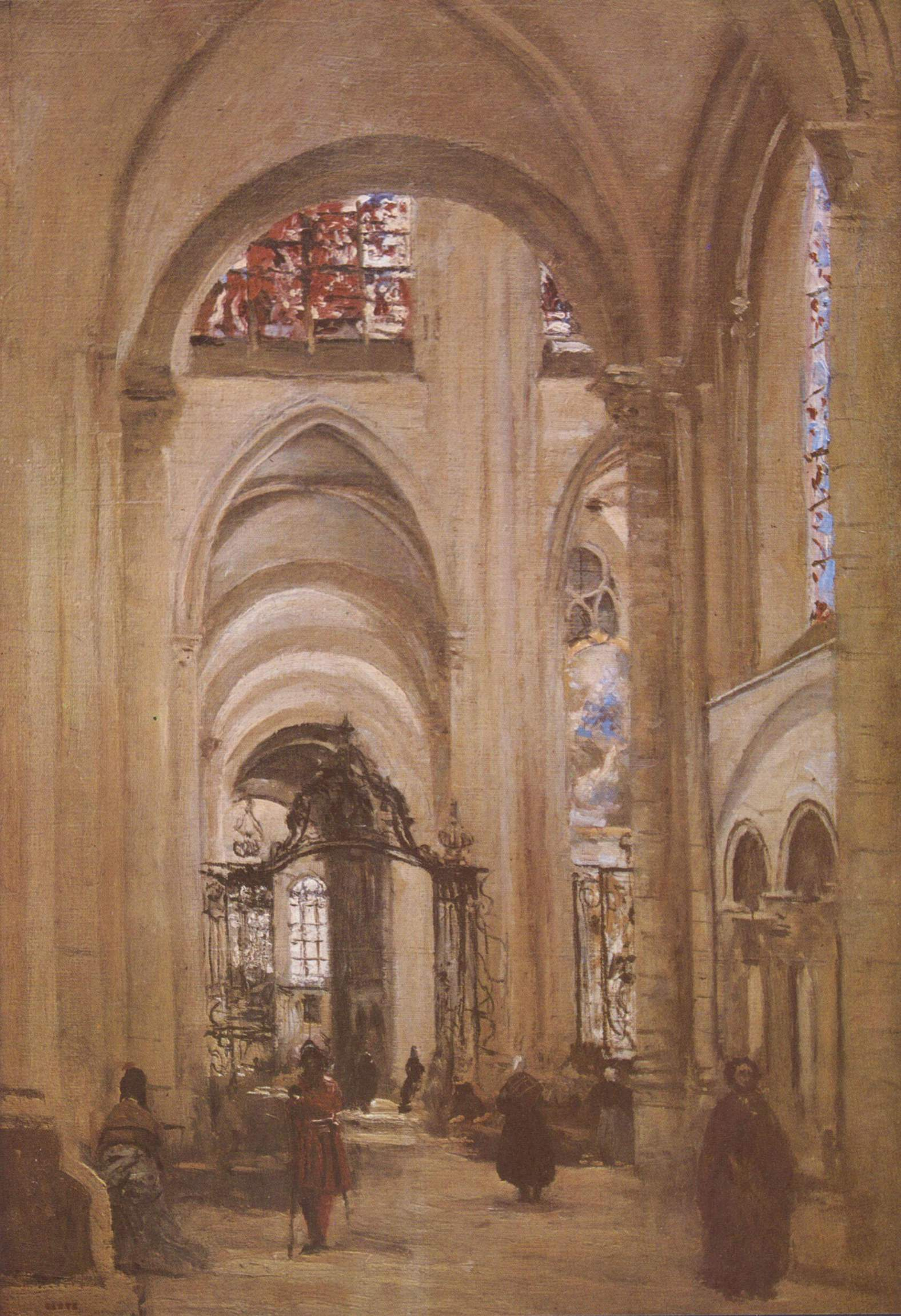
View of the Interior of Sens Cathedral by Corot (1874)

The Council or Synod of Sens (Latin: Concilium Senonense) may refer to any of the following Catholic synods in Sens, France, sometimes recognized as Primate of the Gauls with oversight of the French and German churches:

== c. 601 ==
Held in 600 or 601, this council condemned simony in conformity with the instructions of Pope St Gregory the Great. St Columbanus refused to attend to prevent the possible enactment of a French resolution of the debate concerning the date of Easter then dividing the Frankish and Breton churches.

== Other early medieval councils ==
A series of councils were held in 657, 669 or 670, 833, 845 or 846, 850, 852, 853, 862, 980, 986, 996, 1048, 1071, and 1080, mostly concerned with the privileges of the Abbey of St Pierre le Vif.

In 1009, Archbishop Leotheric (999–1032) of Sens held a provincial council, attended by King Robert I of France, in which the bulls of the popes in favor of the abbey of Fleury-sur-Loire were burned. Pope Sergius IV was so outraged that he summoned the archbishop to Rome to explain his conduct.

== 1141 ==
This council was initially called merely to impart additional solemnity to the exposition of the relics which Henri Sanglier, archbishop of Sens, had donated to Sens Cathedral. Attended by King Louis VII and Archbishop Samson of Reims, it was used by St Bernard of Clairvaux as an opportunity to condemn Peter Abelard for Arianism in distinguishing the members of the Trinity; for Pelagianism in preferring free will to grace; and Nestorianism in dividing the human and divine natures of Jesus Christ. Bernard produced extracts from Abelard's works and called on him to deny having written them, to prove their truth, or to recant and retract them. Abelard, rather than defending himself at the council, attempted to appeal to Pope Innocent II. The council condemned his work but deferred to the pope for judgment on the man himself. Samson and other bishops wrote to Innocent asking for his confirmation of their findings, which he granted, condemning Abelard to perpetual silence. Rather than submit to this, Abelard published an apology confessing orthodox beliefs, desisting from his appeal, and retracting all he had written "contrary to the truth".

Various sources date this council to 1140, although that appears mistaken.

== c. 1198 ==
Held in 1198 or 1199, this council was headed by the papal legate Peter of Capua. It condemned the Cathars (Populicani) who had become popular in Nivernais as a form of Manichaeanism and supposedly counted the dean of Nevers and the abbot of St Martin de Nevers Raynaldus as adherents. Raynaldus was further condemned as a Stercoranist and Origenist and deposed. Both appealed to Pope Innocent III, who ordered Peter and Eudes de Sully, bishop of Paris, to investigate.

== Other late medieval councils ==
A series of councils were held in 1216, 1224 or 1225, 1239, 1252, 1253, 1269, 1280, and 1315, mostly concerned with disciplinary matters. The council in 1224 condemned a work by Scotus Eriugena.

== 1320 ==
The council in May 1320 was presided over by William de Melun, archbishop of Sens. It noted bishops should provide a 40-day indulgence to those fasting on the eve of the Feast of Corpus Christi; directed that jurisdictions were clerics were forcibly detained should be placed under interdict; and condemned priests with beards, long hair, or boots dyed red, green, yellow, or white.

== 1461 ==
The council in 1460 or 1461 was presided over by Louis de Melun. It issued various directives concerning the Eucharist, permissible behavior of the clergy and monks, obligations of the laity towards the church, and other regulations from the Fourth Council of the Lateran, the Council of Basel, and the Pragmatic Sanction of Bourges. It was upheld by a subsequent council under Louis's successor Tristan de Salazar in 1485.

== March 1522 ==
Convened by King Francis I, the council in March 1522 was intended to consider church reform and to approve changes in church taxes similar to those discussed in the 1520 Taxe Cancellarie Apostolice. It had, however, no concrete outcome.
