= Rémy Lejeune =

French painter (1932–1996)

Rémy Lejeune (Ladoré)
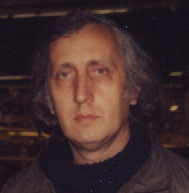
- Born: Rémy Lejeune; 7 October 1932; Montrouge, France
- Died: 17 July 1996 (aged 63); Paris, France
- Known for: Drawing, Engraving, Painting

Remy Ladoré (7 October 1932 – 17 July 1996) was a French draftsman, engraver and painter.

== Biography ==
=== 1932 to 1955 : studies of music and drawing ===
He learns to play the piano, eight hours a day during one year (1942), he will pursues this art playing Mozart and sonatas by Beethoven and Bach. 15 years old, decision is made to move to Paris in order to join the Académe Charpentier and get prepared for the admission competition to l'École nationale supérieure des Métiers d'Art. Successful, he spends the following three years studying at Metiers d’Art. Graduated and willing to carry on drawing, he joins the Académie Julian in 1952. Three years later, his first engraving Spring is published by La guilde de la gravure.

=== 1956 to 1961 : first exhibitions ===
Rémy Lejeune's first (one-man) exhibition in Paris takes place in the galerie Guénéguaud (1956). Critics are very positive, he will subsequently illustrate (pen and ink drawing) the art magazine l'Information artistique during three years. Marcel Sauvage, a French art critic writes a laudatory review about his works entitled The power and diversity of drawing. He participates in a group show, Pointe et burin (galerie Vendôme), his first engravings are exhibited at the Club du Panthéon (Paris). He designs and produces all decors for the exhibition of the Italian Chamber of Commerce in Paris (indoor/outdoor). Illustration (1959 and 1960) of Rameau's Nephew by Diderot and Le roman de Renart (Éditions Bibliolâtres de France) woodcuts, two-tone.

=== 1962 to 1978 : illustration of Boileau’s complete works, prix de Rome competition ===
He is selected by the printer/publisher for book collecting Pierre Bricage to illustrate Boileau’s complete works in five volumes (1962). This choice is made after having been in competition with the 1960 Prix de Rome prize winner. Five years will be necessary to fulfill this work (65 original burin engravings, 39 display letters by woodcut). Competing for the Prix de Rome (line engraving) 1962, he obtains the third place. From 1965 to 1978, he works for a company where he is responsible for design and production of stands decors.

=== 1979 to 1996 : various publications, artist name Rémy Ladoré ===
Publication of 12 drawings (1979) : The different Loves or Moments of Paradise (limited edition). 1981, Rémy Lejeune decides to adopt the pseudonym Rémy Ladoré. The origin of his choice is the repetition of a group of three musical notes from Beethoven's Tenth Sonata ("La", "Do", "Ré", are French musical notes for "A", "C", "D"). He is selected as professor of drawing and painting for the City of Paris (adult classes) in 1987. This title is due to R. Forgas (painter and professor) intervening with Jean Cardot (sculptor and member of the Institut de France ) focusing on the talent of Rémy Lejeune.

1988, he publishes a Collection of engravings : ‘’Fragments of Happiness nearing Bliss’’, presented at the "Salon d'Automne" (Grand Palais). The Taylor foundation organizes a one-man exhibition for him in 1989. exhibition of an engraving made for a text by Jean Racine (1962 for the Prix de Rome competition) and the engravings illustrating the works of Boileau at the Salon des Artistes Français (1994).

== Recognition ==
The French critic Marcel Sauvage wrote : « There is a nobility in drawing, in personal meaning, in the respect for traditions and in the precise movements of a drawing. Rémy Lejeune is thus one of the first -if not the first- draftsman of his generation to devote himself to realism and surrealism, through the moving purity of line and form, as well as the sensual and spiritual brilliance of the motifs. He pursues these with total objectivity and a serious sense of humor. »

== Works ==
- 40 drawings, size 24x32cm as well as numerous engravings for bibliophily works (1959 to 1962).
- 12 printed drawings with title Fragments of Happiness nearing Bliss limited edition.
- Thirty watercolor paintings, twenty oil paintings (1991 to 1995).
- A collection of 9 engravings, limited edition, 30x50cm Fragments of Happiness Nearing Bliss.
- Large drawings up to 1 meter (1975 to 1992).
- A masterwork Opera to the mechanics genius ended 1990, 2.20mx1.20m.

== Exhibitions ==
- 1956 to 1996, Galerie Guénégaud 1956, Club du Panthéon, Groupe des dix Pointe et burin Galerie Vendome 1959, Galerie Vialetay, Bibliothèque Forney, Deauville (Révélation award) 1988, Salon d'Automne (Grand Palais, Paris) 1988, Taylor Foundation 1989, Cimaises Ventadour, Salon des artistes français 1994, Salon du Dessin et de la Peinture à l'eau 1995
- 1998 to 2015, Salon des artistes français 1998, Carrousel du Louvre (Société Nationale des Beaux-Arts) 2006, Art Capital (Grand Palais, Paris) Exhibition of the masterwork Opera to the mechanics genius (drawing 200 x 120 cm) 2008, Galerie Everarts, Galerie Beatrice Bellat, Art Capital (Grand Palais, Paris) 2015. Galerie Mona Lisa, Paris 2016.

== Publications ==
- 1959 Rameau's Nephew, Diderot, illustrations by Rémy Lejeune (Ladoré), Bibliolâtres de France Edition, 1959
- 1960 Les Aventures de Maitre Renart et d'Ysengrin son compère, illustrations by Rémy Lejeune (Ladoré), Bibliolâtres de France Edition, 1960
- 1961 Boileau’s complete works (in 5 volumes) illustrated by Rémy Lejeune (Ladoré), Editors Pierre & Berthe , 1961
- 1979 The Different Loves or Moments of Paradise, Remy Ladoré, 1979
- 1988 Fragments of Happiness Nearing Bliss, collection of 9 engravings by Rémy Ladoré, 1988
- 2001 Rémy Ladoré, 1932-1996, Somogy Editions (ISBN 2-85056-522-9)

== Awards ==
- 3rd place grand prix de Rome (engraving), 1962
- Revelation award Deauville, 1988
