= Savinian and Potentian =

Saints Savinian and Potentian
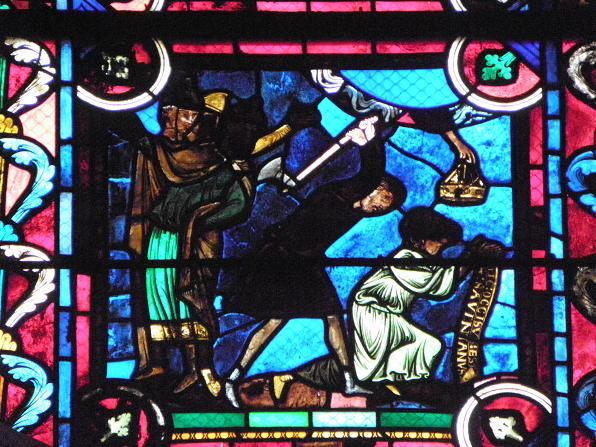
- The Martyrdom of Saint Savinian. Church of Saint-Étienne de Sens.

Bishops, martyrs
- Died: 390; Sens
- Venerated in: Roman Catholic Church; Eastern Orthodox Church
- Canonized: Pre-Congregation
- Feast: December 31
- Patronage: Sens, Archdiocese of Sens

Saints Savinian and Potentian (French: Savinien et Potenti(e)n) (d. 390) are martyrs commemorated as the patron saints and founders of the diocese of Sens, France. Savinian should not be confused with another early French martyr, Sabinian of Troyes.

Gregory of Tours does not mention them, nor does the Hieronymian Martyrology, which was revised before 600 at Auxerre or Autun. One source states that "it is considered likely that Sabinian and Potentian were bishops of Sens, with Potentian succeeding Sabinian." On the other hand, one source calls only Sabinian a bishop; and also states that they had been sent to Sens "by the Roman Pontiff to preach the Gospel, and they rendered illustrious that city by the martyrdom following their confession of faith." Later traditions made them earlier saints as disciples of Saint Peter.

A tradition states that they initially preached at Ferrières in the Gâtinais before preaching at Sens.

Another states that Savinian was killed with an axe at the spot now occupied by the crypt of the church at Sens dedicated to the two saints.

== Veneration ==
There is a church dedicated to the two saints at Sens. It is said to have been founded by the saints in the third century, rebuilt in the fifth, and restored in the eleventh. One source writes that "the altar [of this church] is affirmed to be that upon which Saint Savinien was celebrating at the moment of his martyrdom."

At Chartres Cathedral, a stained glass window (number 17) depicts the two saints.

They are mentioned in the work of the medieval poet Adam of St. Victor:

Let us lift God's high laudation,
We, who joyous commendation
To His saints now loudly give;
To Savinian, widely noted,
And Potentian, God-devoted,
Both of whom did Gaul receive!
