= Paul d'Albert, Cardinal de Luynes =

French prelate

His Eminence Cardinal de Luynes
- Cardinal, Archbishop of Sens
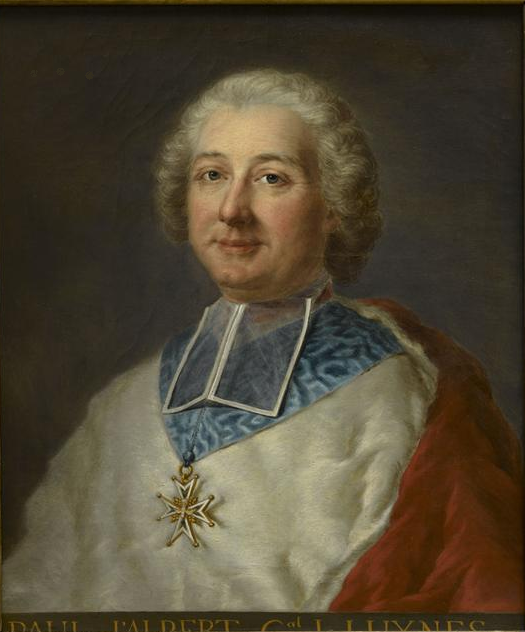
- Portrait of Cardinal de Luynes by François-Adrien Latinville
- Church: Roman Catholic
- Archdiocese: Sens
- In office: 1753–1788
- Predecessor: Jean-Joseph Languet de Gergy
- Successor: Loménie de Brienne
- Other posts: Cardinal-Priest of San Tommaso in Parione (1758–88)
- Previous post: Bishop of Bayeux (1729–53)

Orders
- Consecration: 25 September 1729 by Louis de La Vergne-Montenard de Tressan
- Created cardinal: 2 April 1756 by Pope Benedict XIV
- Rank: Cardinal-Priest

Personal details
- Born: 5 January 1703 Versailles, France
- Died: 21 January 1788 (aged 85) Paris, France
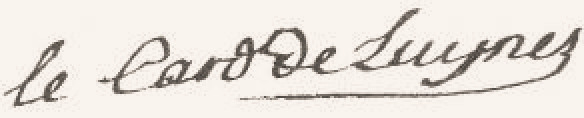
- Signature

Styles of Paul d'Albert
- Reference style: His Eminence
- Spoken style: Your Eminence
- Informal style: Cardinal
- See: Sens

Paul d'Albert (French pronunciation: [pɔl dalbɛʁ]; 5 January 1703 – 21 January 1788) was a French prelate. He was elected the seventh occupant of Académie française seat 29 in 1743.

== Early life ==
Paul d'Albert was born on 5 January 1703 in the city of Versailles, where his family occupied the Hôtel de Luynes, a grand hôtel particulier. He was the second son of Marie Anne Jeanne de Courcillon (d. 1718) and Honoré-Charles d'Albert de Luynes (1669–1704). (Note: His father, Honoré Charles d'Albert de Luynes (1669–1704), was styled the Duke of Montfort then the Duke of Chevreuse until his death in 1704. His aunt, Marie Anne d'Albert de Luynes (1671–1694) was the wife of Charles François de Montmorency-Luxembourg (son of François Henri de Montmorency) and his uncle, Louis Auguste d'Albert de Luynes (1678–1744) married Marie Anne Romaine de Beaumanoir.) His elder brother was Charles Philippe d'Albert de Luynes, who became the 4th Duke of Luynes (and married Louise-Léontine de Bourbon, Princess of Neuchatel and a granddaughter of Louis de Bourbon, Count of Soissons).

His father was the eldest son of Charles Honoré d'Albert, 3rd Duke of Luynes, but did not become the Duke of Luynes because he died before his father. His maternal grandfather was Philippe de Courcillon, the French officer and diarist. He was also the great-great-grandson of the Charles d'Albert, duc de Luynes, a favorite of King Louis XIII.

== Career ==
On 17 February 1729, he was selected Bishop of Bayeux, France. He was confirmed on 17 August 1729 and ordained on 25 September 1729. On 9 August 1753, he was selected to succeeded Jean-Joseph Languet de Gergy as Archbishop of Sens. He resigned as Bishop of Bayeux on 21 September 1753 and was confirmed as Archbishop on 26 November 1753.

Less than three years later on 5 April 1756, he was elevated to Cardinal. On 2 August 1758, he was installed as Cardinal-Priest of San Tommaso in Parione. Considered one of the "seminary-trained clerical aristocrats," the Cardinal was called upon in the Fontainebleau of Marie Antoinette to rebuke the fashionable vices of courtiers:

"Everything he had prepared had been composed in order to recall high society to the unassuming ways of real Christians. Some hundred of peasants, sitting on their clogs, surrounded by the baskets they had used to carry their vegetables or fruit to market, listened to His Eminence without understanding a single word he addressed to them...[But he was heard] to cry out, in the vehemence of the perfect pastor, 'My dear brethren, why do you bring this luxury with you into the very entrance to the sanctuary? Why do these velvet cushions, these laced and fringed handbags, lie in front of your entry into the Lord's house?"

=== Scientific interests ===
During his time in Bayeux, he protected the Académie des Sciences, Arts et Belles-Lettres de Caen and from 1731 to 1753, his residence in Caen housed the sessions of the Academy. An amateur astronomer who was deeply interested in physics, he made several important astronomical observations and worked closely with Réginald Outhier.

He was elected the seventh occupant of Académie française seat on 29 in 1743.

De Luynes endorsed the chocolate manufacturer Brasselard, a grocer based on the Rue de Tournon in the 6th arrondissement of Paris who was also endorsed by the Société Royale de Médecine. In 1776, when correspondeding with the physician Théophile de Bordeu regarding de Bordeau's recommendation that the Cardinal refrain from eating chocolate, which his personal doctor encouraged, he wrote: "The view of the learned chemist who has analysed it and who concludes from these experiments that the use of cacao is very advantageous for old people, whose radical moisture dries out with age; the experiment I made over two years of the marked advantage that I always derived from it with regard to the looseness of the belly and the sweetening of my phlegm, have caused me to remain firm in my sentiment and the more so since it is not out of gourmandise that I am attached to it, my palate in no may please by the taste of cacao."

== Personal life ==
He had a summer residence in Sommervieu in the Normandy region in northwestern France.

De Luynes died in Paris on 21 January 1788.

== Gallery ==
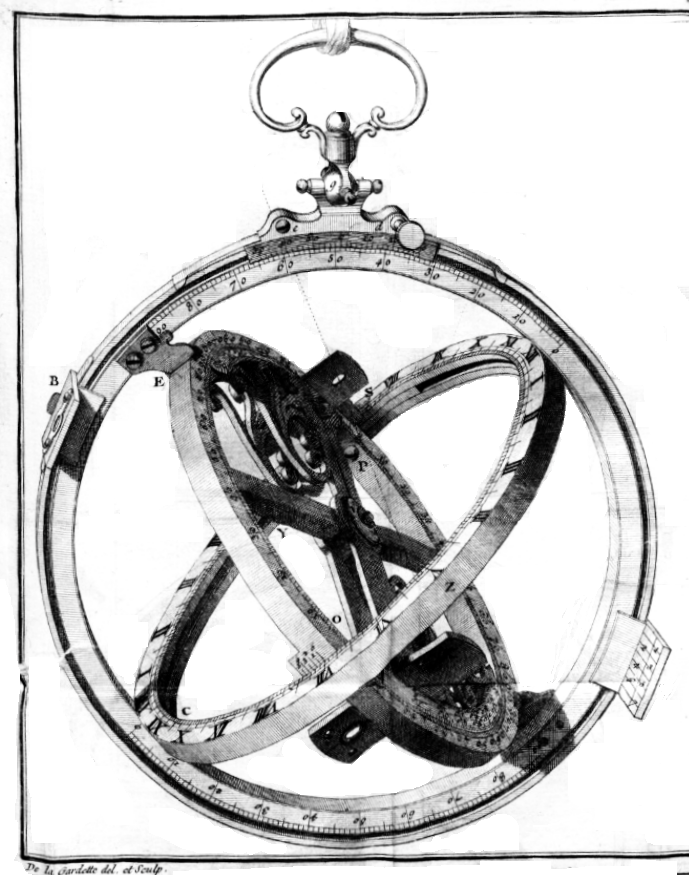
Partial view of his astronomical ring

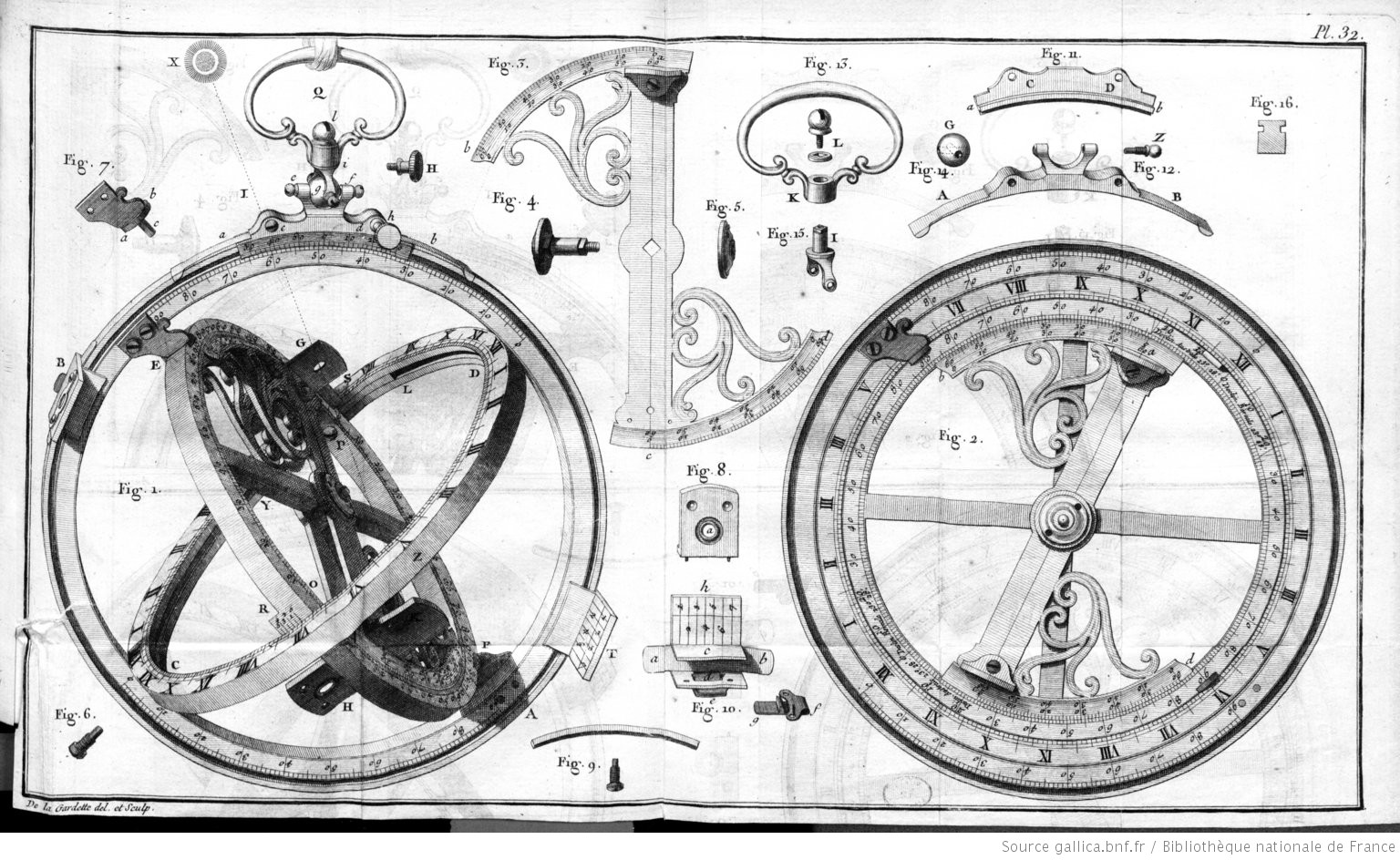
His astronomical ring

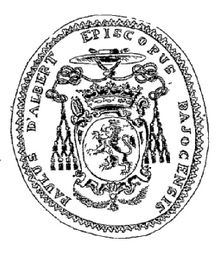
Paul d'Albert de Luynes's seal

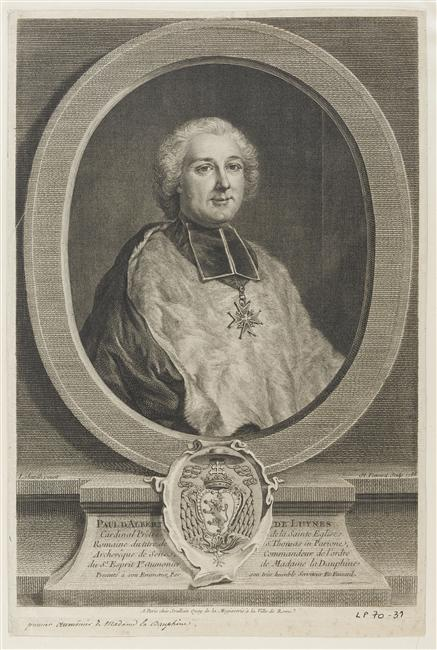

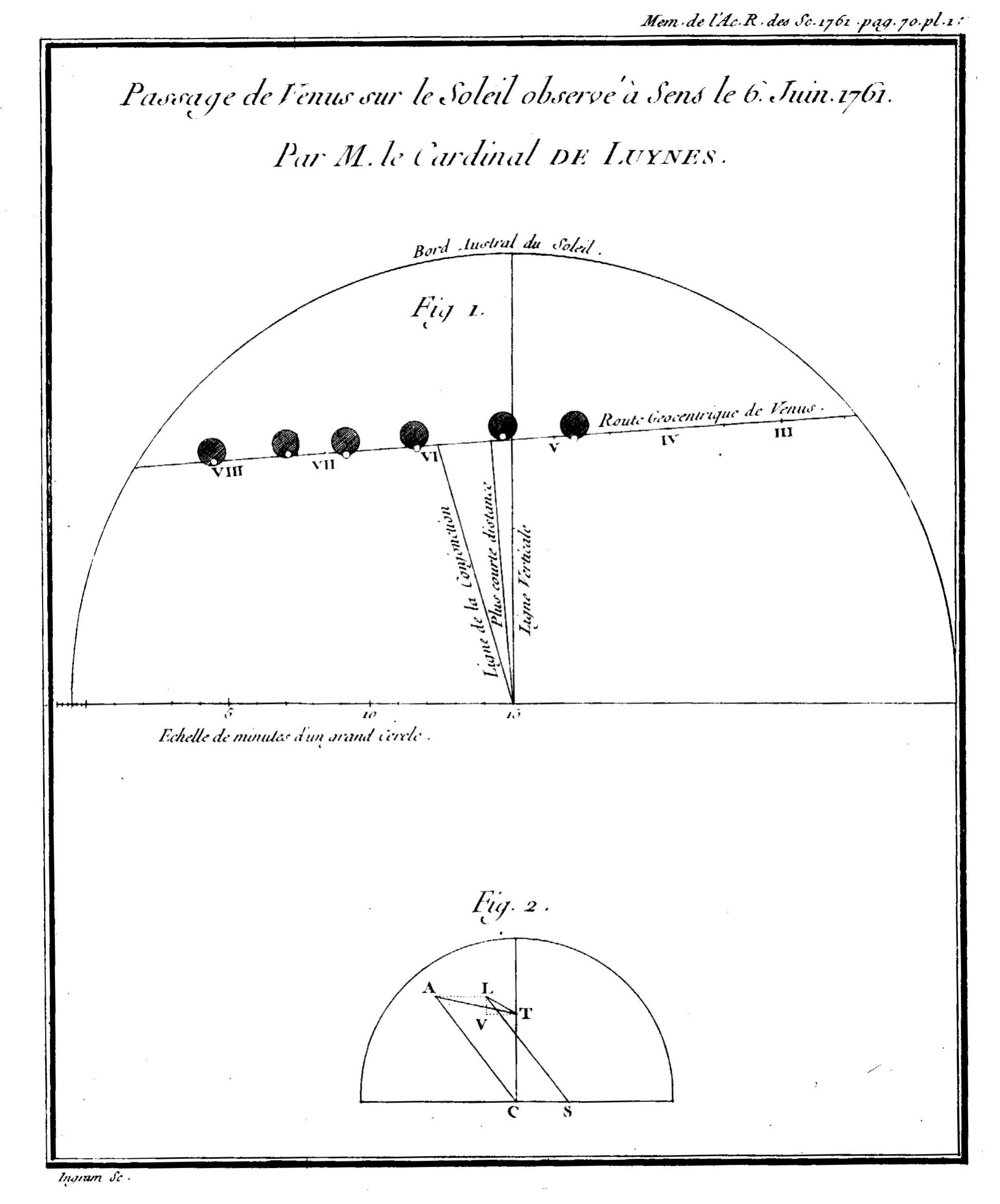
Records of the passage of Venus in front of the Sun's disk.

Records
Preceded by Ludovico Calini	Oldest living Member of the Sacred College; 9 December 1782 – 21 January 1788	Succeeded by Francesco Maria Banditi
Catholic Church titles
Preceded by Jean-Joseph Languet de Gergy	Archbishop of Sens; 1753–1788	Succeeded by Loménie de Brienne
Preceded by François Armand de Lothringen-Armagnac	Bishop of Bayeux; 1729–1753	Succeeded by Pierre-Jules César de Rochechouart-Montigny
