= Henri Sanglier =

Henri Sanglier (1085–1142 or 1144) was a French Catholic bishop.

He was born in Poitou and became the archbishop of Sens from 1122 until his death. He ordered the construction of Sens Cathedral around 1130. He also presided over the 1140 Council of Sens at which Bernard of Clairvaux accused Peter Abelard of heresy.
