= François Poncher =

François Poncher (1480–1532) was the Bishop of Paris from 1519 to 1532.

He was born in Tours in 1480, the son of Louis de Poncher and his wife, Robine le Gendre. In 1532, François Poncher joined his uncle Étienne de Poncher in the Duchy of Milan where Étienne de Poncher was serving as chancellor for Louis XII of France.

François Poncher became a canon of Notre Dame de Paris, taking the minor orders in May 1505. In 1510, he entered the Parlement of Paris as an ecclesiastical councilor. He was ordained as a priest on 16 April 1511. He subsequently became abbot of Saint-Maur-des-Fossés.

In 1519, Francis I of France selected him to be Bishop of Paris in succession to his uncle Étienne de Poncher who was Bishop of Paris 1503-19. In 1526, an investigation was launched into whether Poncher had illegally attempted to several benefices, including Saint-Benoît-sur-Loire. In 1529, evidence was presented showing that Poncher had conspired against Francis I of France while Francis was being held prisoner by Spain. He was subsequently imprisoned in Vincennes in 1531. France then entered into negotiations with the papal court to determine who was competent to judge Poncher.

Before a trial could be held, François Poncher died in custody on 1 September 1532.

Catholic Church titles
Preceded by Étienne de Poncher	Bishop of Paris; 1519–1532	Succeeded by Jean du Bellay
