= Étienne de Poncher =

French prelate and diplomat

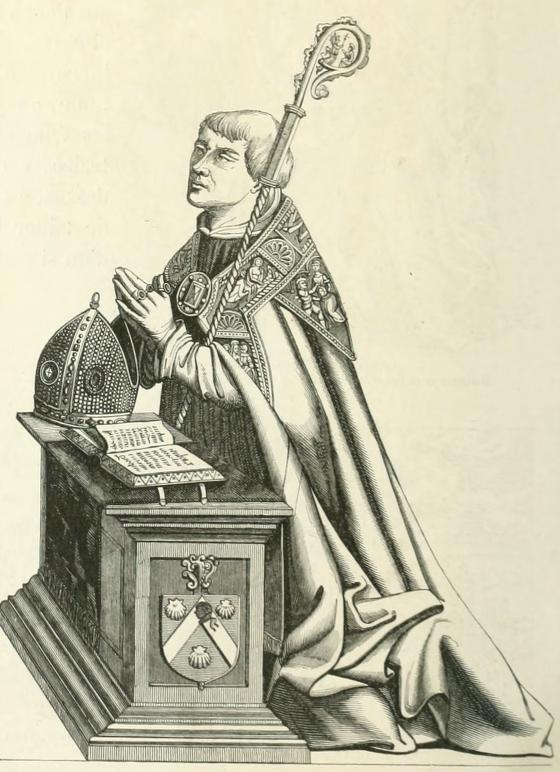
Étienne de Poncher

Étienne de Poncher (1446–1524) was a French prelate and diplomat. After studying law he was early provided with a prebend, and became councillor at the parlement of Paris in 1485 and president of the Chambre des Enquêtes in 1498.

Elected bishop of Paris in 1503 at the instance of Louis XII, he was entrusted by the king with diplomatic missions in Germany and Italy. After being appointed chancellor of the Duchy of Milan, he became Keeper of the seals of France in 1512, and retained that post, until the accession of Francis I, who employed him on various diplomatic missions.

Poncher became archbishop of Sens in 1519. His Constitutions synodales was published in 1514.

Catholic Church titles
Preceded by Jean-Simon de Champigny	Bishop of Paris; 1503–1519	Succeeded by François Poncher
Preceded by Tristan de Salazar	Archbishop of Sens; 1519–1524	Succeeded by Antoine Duprat
