= Daimbert (archbishop of Sens) =

Eleventh-century French archbishop

Daimbert was Archbishop of Sens from 1098 to 1122. He was consecrated to that office in 1097 in Rome, only after having been given assurance that he recognised Lyon's primacy over Sens. He consecrated Louis VI of France at Orléans in 1108, one of the few royal consecrations not to occur at Reims.
