= Réginald Outhier =

French astronomer and priest

Abbé Réginald Outhier also given as Regnauld or Renaud Outhier (16 August 1694 – 12 April 1774) was a French clergyman, traveller, and writer who worked on cartography and astronomy.

Outhier was born at La Marre-Jouserans, near Poligny, France, and studied at Dole and Besançon. He became a priest at Besançon, where he became interested in astronomy. He later served as a canon at Bayeux Cathedral. In 1726–1727 he presented a 5-inch-diameter celestial globe to the Académie Royale des Sciences, which demonstrated the movements of the sun and stars with a clockwork mechanism. This impressed Cassini II who made him a correspondent to the Royal Academy in 1731. In 1733 he became involved in producing a map of France along with Bishop of Bayeux, Paul d'Albert de Luynes and took part in the triangulation surveys from Caen to St. Malo. He was included in the Academy's expedition in 1736–1737 to Lapland to examine the shape of the earth. The expedition was led by Pierre-Louis Moreau de Maupertuis, with the scientists included being Alexis Claude Clairaut, Charles Le Monnier and Charles Etienne Louis Camus. The Swedish scientist Anders Celsius was also involved and Outhier was included as physician, astronomer and maintainer of the journal of the expedition. He drew maps of the travels and published the notes on the voyage in 1744. In 1752 he drew an accurate map of the night sky covering the Pleiades.

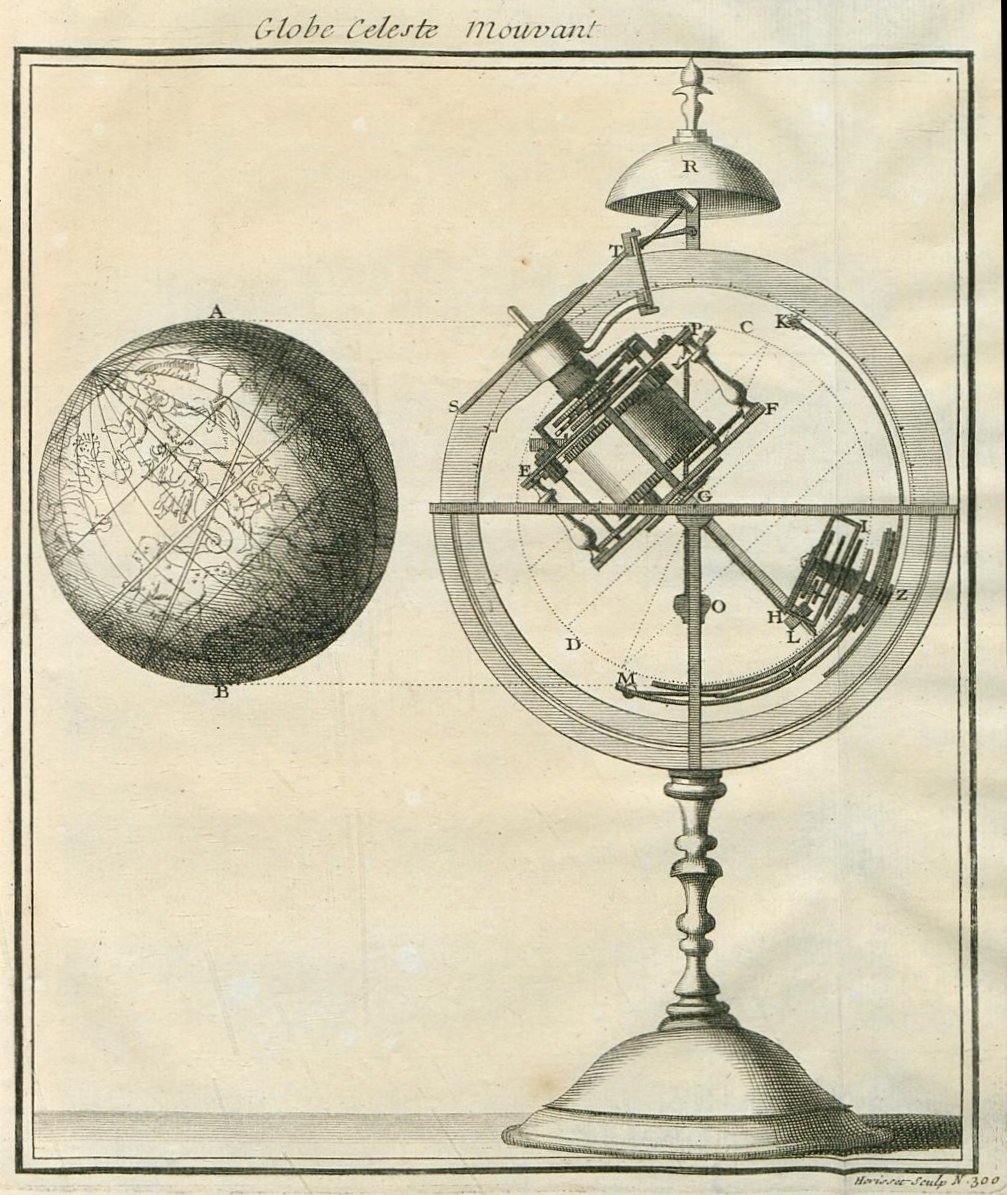
Outhier's celestial globe

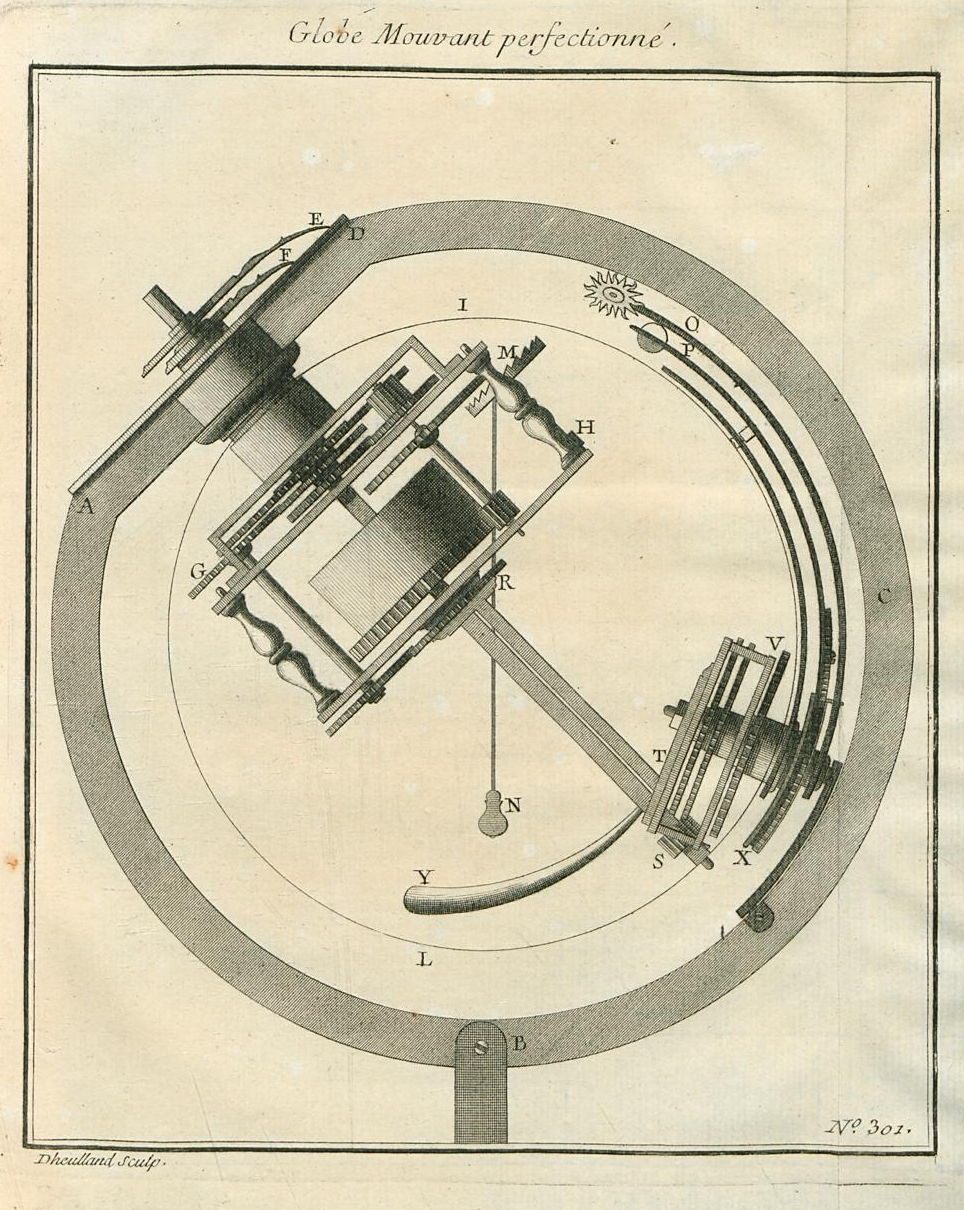
