= Jean-Joseph Languet de Gergy =

French theologian

The Most Reverend Jean-Joseph Languet de Gergy
- Archbishop of Sens
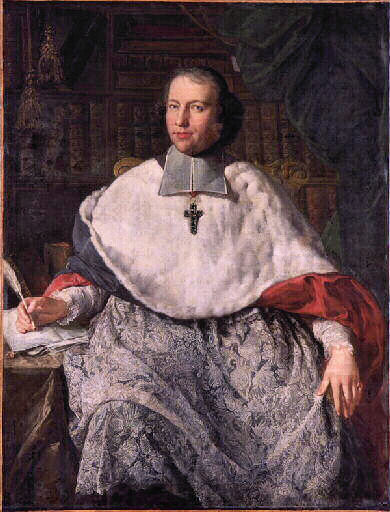
- Church: Roman Catholic
- In office: 1731–1753
- Predecessor: Denis-François Bouthillier de Chavigny
- Successor: Paul d'Albert de Luynes
- Other post: Bishop of Soissons (1715–31)

Orders
- Consecration: 23 June 1715 by François de Mailly

Personal details
- Born: 25 August 1677 Dijon, France
- Died: 11 May 1753 (aged 75) Sens, France

Jean-Joseph Languet de Gergy (French pronunciation: [ʒɑ̃ ʒozɛf lɑ̃ɡɛ də ʒɛʁʒi]; 25 August 1677 – 11 May 1753) was a Catholic French bishop and theologian. He was first bishop of Soissons and then archbishop of Sens. He was a member of the Académie française.

== Biography ==
Son of the public prosecutor of the parlement of Bourgogne, Languet de Gercy was a protégé of Jacques Bénigne Bossuet. Bossuet introduced him to King Louis XIV of France who appointed him chaplain to his grandson's wife, Marie-Adélaïde of Savoy.

Languet de Gercy was the general vicar of the diocese of Autun, which includes the parish of Paray-le-Monial where Saint Marguerite Marie Alacoque is buried. Ordered to investigate the miracles that were said to have occurred at her hand, he wrote a biography of Alacoque in 1729.

Languet de Gercy was named bishop of Soissons in 1715, and elected member of l'Académie française in 1721. He was also named archbishop of Sens in 1730 and a member of the Conseil d'État (Council of State) in 1747.

Languet de Gergy's work on the life of Alacoque was violently attacked by the Jansenists opposed to the Catholic devotion of the Sacred Heart. Also defender of the papal bull Unigenitus, he participated in numerous political-religious controversies, and was equally known for both the content of his pamphlets, and their number. He belonged to the parti des dévots opposed to the philosophies of the Age of Enlightenment and fought fiercely against the candidacies of Montesquieu and Voltaire to l'Académie française.

In addition to his treatises and religious pamphlets, Languet de Gergy was the author of books on the Divine Office, catechism, and of pastoral letters.

== Publications ==
- Du Véritable esprit de l'Église dans l'usage de ses cérémonies, ou Réfutation du traité de D. Cl. de Vert intitulé : « Explication simple et historique des cérémonies de l'Église » (1715, Of the True Spirit of the Church in the Usage of its Ceremonies, or Refutation of the Treatise of Claude de Vert, titled "Simple and Historical Explanation of the Ceremonies of the Church)
- Traité de la confiance en la miséricorde de Dieu, augmenté d'un Traité du faux bonheur des gens du monde et du vrai bonheur de la vie chrétienne (1718, Treatise on the Belief and Graciousness in God, an addition to a Treatise of False Happiness of the People of the Word and the True Happiness of the Christian Life). Online Text, in French:
- La Vie de la vénérable Mère Marguerite-Marie, religieuse de la Visitation Sainte Marie du monastère de Paray-le-Monial en Charolais, morte en odeur de sainteté en 1690 (1729, The Life of the Venerable Mother Marguerite-Marie, nun of the Visitation of Saint Mary of the Monastery of Paray-le-Monial in Charolais, who died in sanctity in 1690)
- Traité sur les moyens de connaître la vérité dans l'Église (1749, Treatise on the Ways to Know the Truth in the Church)
- Recueil d’écrits polémiques (1752, Collection of Polemic Writings)
- Mémoires inédits de Languet de Gergy, archevêque de Sens (1863, Inedited Memories of Languet de Gergy, archbishop of Sens). In La Famille d'Aubigné et l'enfance de Madame de Maintenon by Théophile Lavallée.
