= Bibliothèque Forney =

Coordinates: 48.853389°N 2.359078°E

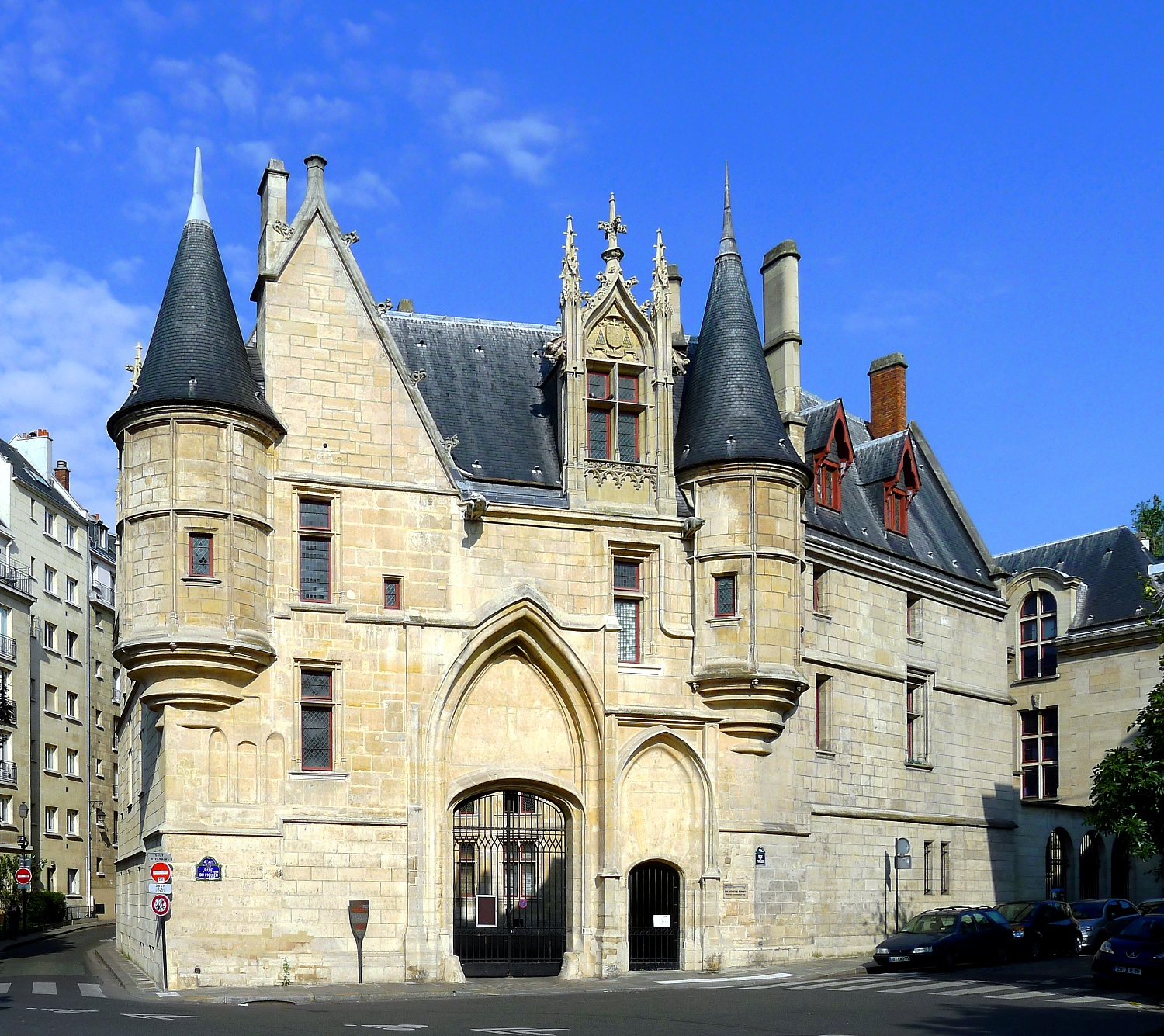
Front view of the Hôtel de Sens, which has housed the library since 1961.

The Forney Library (French: Bibliothèque Forney) is part of the network of heritage and specialized libraries of the City of Paris.

== Collection ==
The Forney Library's collection is dedicated to the decorative arts, the art and craft professions and their techniques, fine arts, graphic arts, fashion, advertising and design.

=== Books ===
230,000 books.

=== Catalogs ===
More than 50,000 catalogs for temporary exhibitions and museums, 50,000 catalogs for public art sales from 1750 to the present day, more than 50,000 commercial catalogs (around 7,000 firms, manufacturers and distributors) since the 19th century (Le Bon Marché, La Redoute, Manufrance, etc.), the catalogs of the main French art fairs and those of French and foreign universal exhibitions.

=== Journals ===
4,000 titles are kept (of which 300 are journals with current subscriptions), especially in the fields of architecture, design, caricature, fashion and the art market.

=== Posters ===
A collection of advertising posters from 1880 to the present day, a collection of 9,000 samples of wallpaper, printed canvases from the 18th and early 19th centuries, samples fabrics and lace, original designs of furniture and decorations (Fourdinois, Villeneuve, Maubert), a collection of postcards, popular images (such as chromolithographs and Épinal prints) and advertising and commercial documents (labels, menus, games...).

=== Graphic Arts ===
Rare document devoted to printing, consisting of books, brochures, periodicals and more than 900 printer's catalogs illustrated with typographic characters and vignettes.

== Location ==
The library is located at the Hôtel de Sens in the 4th arrondissement of Paris in the Marais.

== History ==
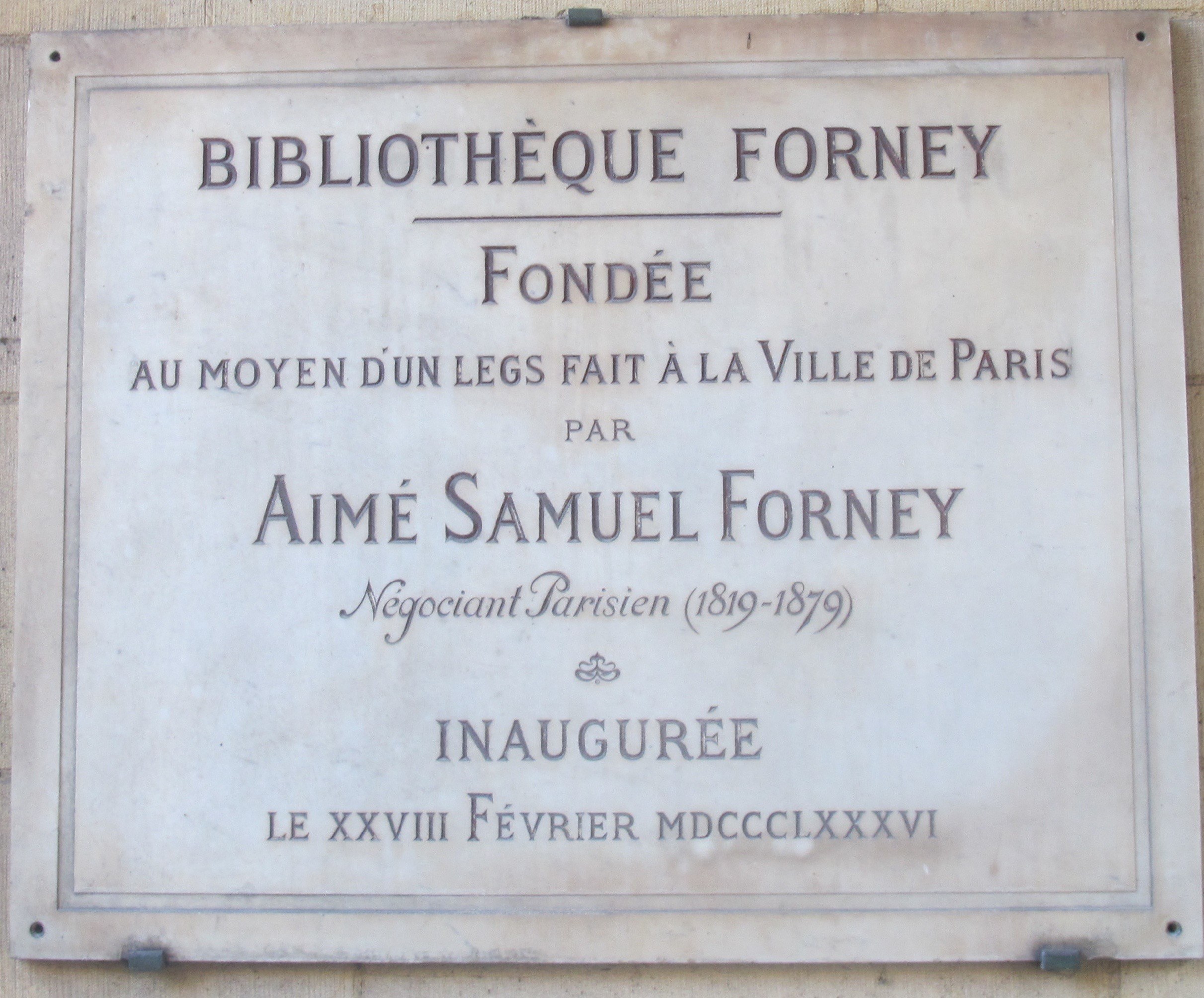
Plaque commemorating the founder Aimé Samuel Forney at the Hôtel de Sens

The library is named for Aimé Samuel Forney (1819–1879), a businessman of Swiss origin particularly interested in professional training and artistic crafts who left a bequest to the City of Paris to create an institution promoting education of artisans.

Founded in 1886 in the heart of Faubourg Saint-Antoine, an artisan district of Paris, the premises quickly became too cramped. In 1929, the plan of transferring the library to the Hôtel de Sens was adopted, but due to the extreme state of disrepair of the building, the library did not open at the Hôtel de Sens until 1961.

== See also ==
- List of libraries in France
