= Antoine Duprat =

Catholic cardinal

His Eminence Antoine Duprat
- Archbishop of Sens; Chancellor of France
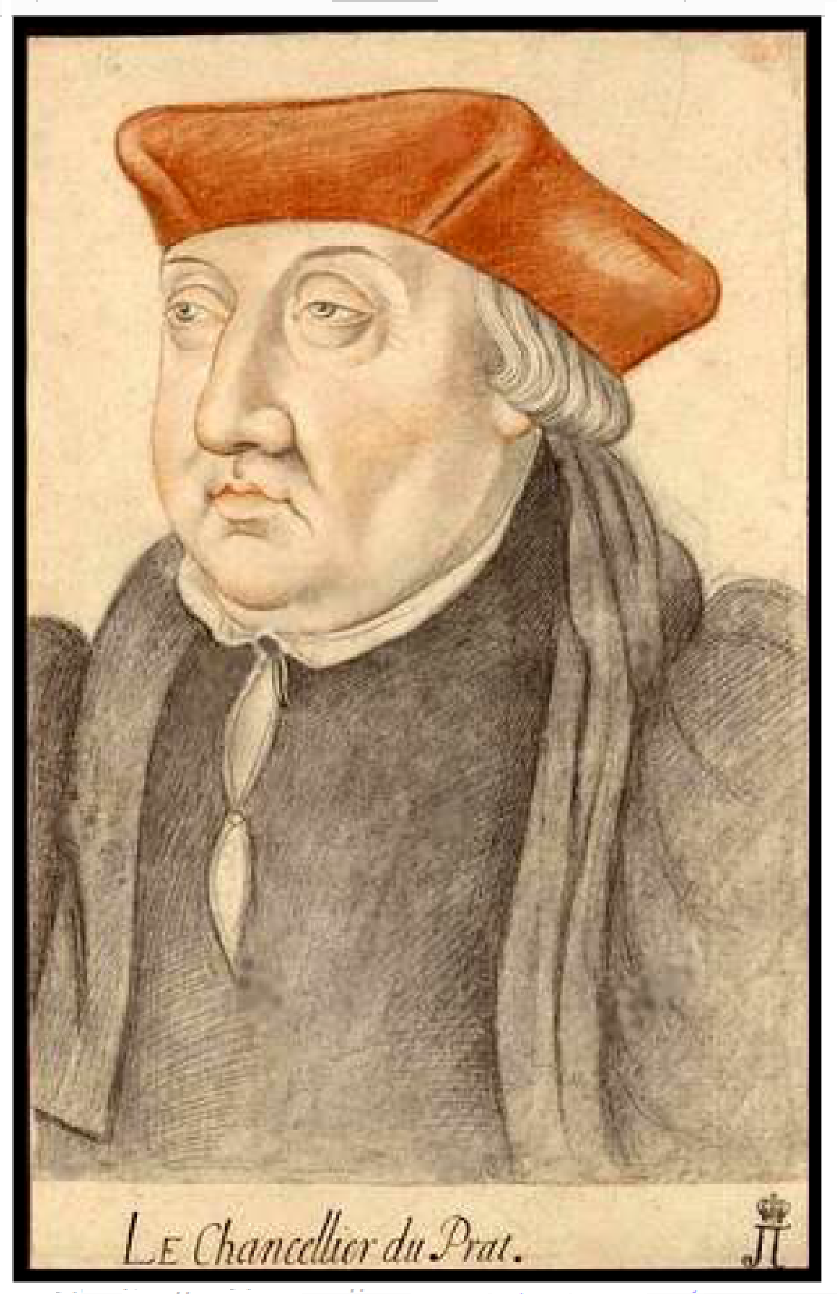
- Cardinal Duprat, c. 1525
- Church: Catholic Church
- Archdiocese: Sens
- Appointed: 20 March 1525
- Term ended: 9 July 1535
- Predecessor: Étienne de Poncher
- Successor: Jean de Bertrand
- Other posts: Cardinal-Priest of Sant'Anastasia al Palatino (1528-1535); Administrator of Albi (1528-1535); Bishop of Meaux (1534-1535)
- Previous posts: Bishop of Valence (1522-1524)

Orders
- Created cardinal: 21 November 1527 by Pope Clement VII
- Rank: Cardinal-Priest

Personal details
- Born: 17 January 1463 Issoire, Auvergne
- Died: 9 July 1535 (aged 72) Meaux, France
- Buried: Sens Cathedral

Antoine Duprat (17 January 1463 – 9 July 1535) was a French Cardinal and politician, who was chancellor of France.

== Life ==
Duprat was born in Issoire in Auvergne. Educated for the law, he won a high position in his profession and in 1507 became first president of the Parlement of Paris (the highest court of France). In 1515 Francis I of France made him chancellor of France and prime minister.

In 1517, after his wife's death, he took holy orders and gradually rose in the Catholic Church hierarchy: first as bishop of several dioceses held by him in plurality; then as Archbishop of Sens, 1525; cardinal, 1527, and legate a latere, 1530. Duprat's influence extended much beyond the departments of justice and finance placed under his direct control. French historian Gabriel Hanotaux, in the introduction to his Recueil des instructions, calls Duprat

one of the most notable men of ancient France, second only to Richelieu in the decisive influence he exercised on the destinies of his country.

This influence was constantly exerted to strengthen royal absolute power; it was felt in the measures he took against the grands Seigneurs and in his elaborate fiscal system.

Duprat left no writings, but took a leading part in the compilation of the "Coutumes d'Auvergne"; he also did much to encourage the renaissance of letters.

== Churchman ==
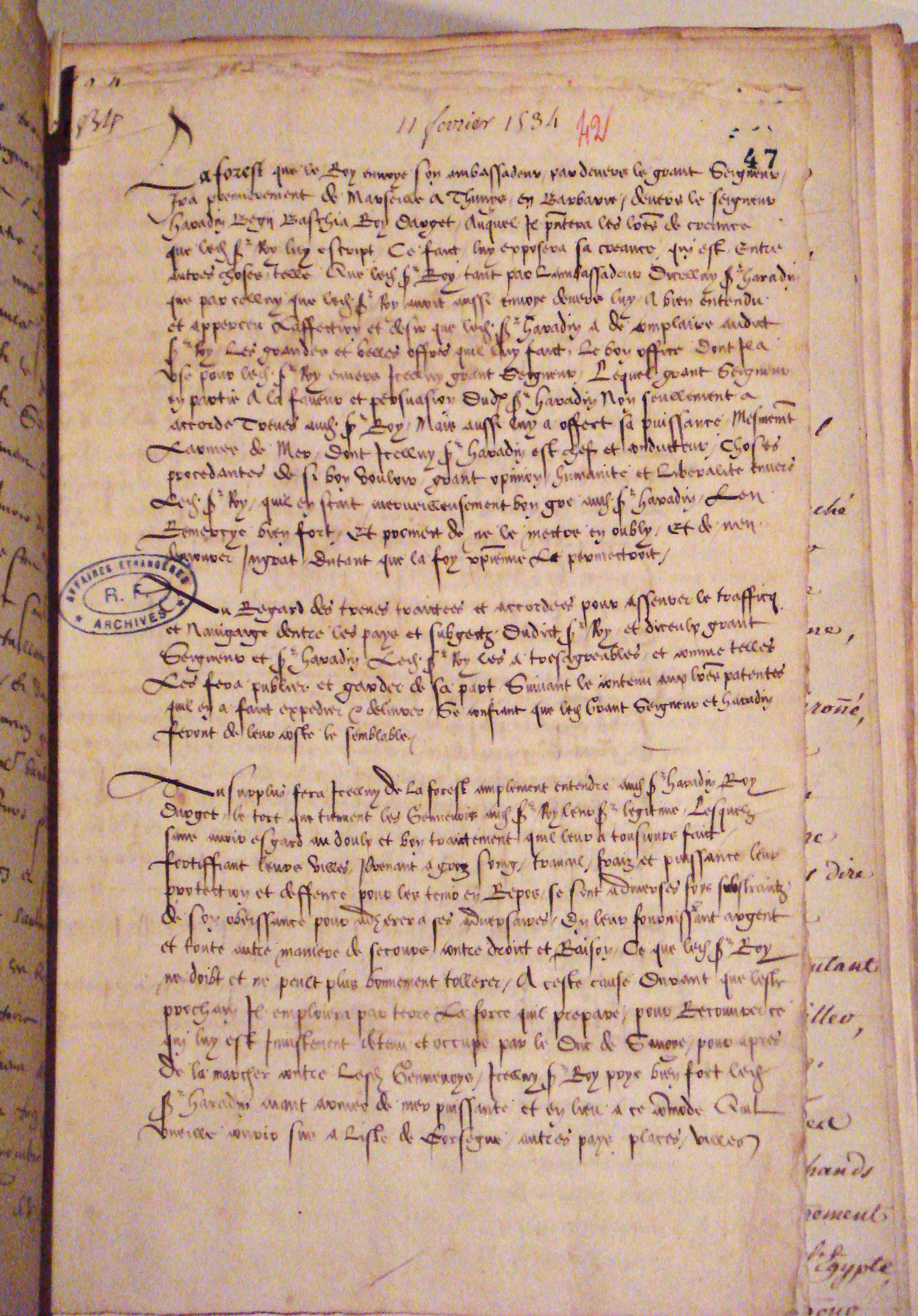
Military instructions to Ambassador to the Ottoman Empire Jean de La Forêt, by Chancellor Antoine Duprat (copy), 11 February 1535.

Duprat's influence was also manifested, together with his orthodoxy, in those measures which affected the relations of France with the Church, namely, the signing of the Concordat of Bologna, and the checking of nascent Protestantism. The Concordat, which Duprat himself negotiated with Pope Leo X at Bologna, did away with the principles of the "Pragmatic Sanction"; on the other hand, by causing the appointment of the French hierarchy to rest on royal nomination instead of the old canonical elections, it vested in the civil power an authority over church affairs.

Duprat's uncompromising attitude towards Protestantism was dictated both by his political sense, as well as his Catholic orthodoxy. The Protestant sympathies of Marguerite d'Angouleme, the Duchesse d'Etampes, and the Minister du Bellay failed to move him. The Sorbonne and the Parlement were instructed to exclude the writings of the innovators; in 1534 the posting of subversive pamphlets at the door of the royal apartments cost the perpetrators their lives.

Despite being archbishop of Sens for several years, the first time he entered the cathedral there was for his own funeral.

Catholic Church titles
Preceded by Étienne de Poncher	Archbishop of Sens; 1525–1537	Succeeded by Louis de Bourbon-Vendôme
