= Tristan de Salazar =

Archbishop of Sens (c. 1431–1518)

Coat of arms of Tristan de Salazar

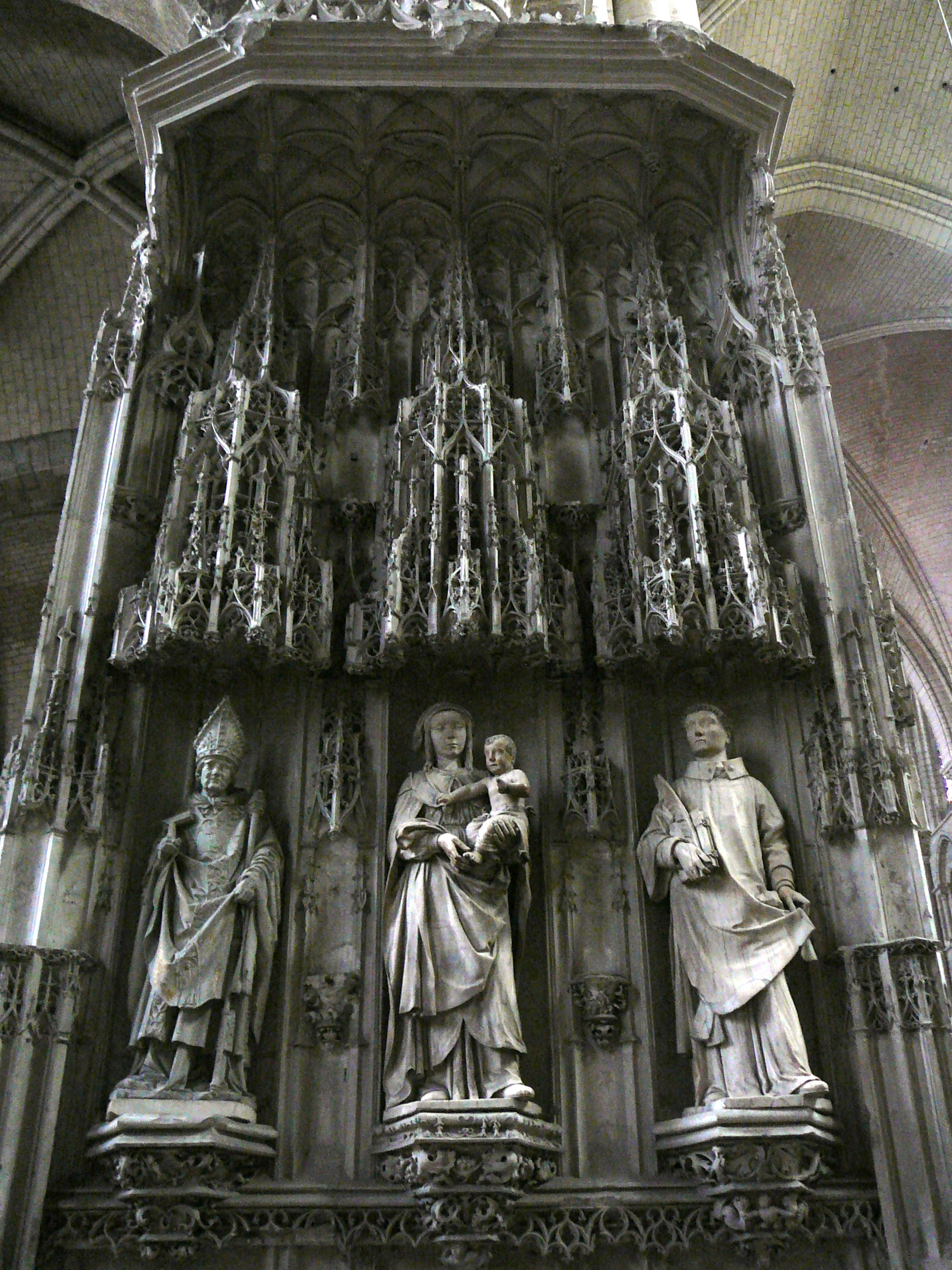
The monument of Salazar

Étienne Tristan de Salazar (c.1431 – February 11, 1518) was the Archbishop of Sens from 1475 to 1518.

== Biography ==
Étienne Tristan de Salazar was born in Saint-Maurice-Thizouaille ca. 1431, the son of Jean Salazar (a leader of the Écorcheurs) and his wife Marguerite, who was the daughter of Georges de la Trémoille. Tristan de Salazar was himself an illegitimate child, and in his youth he was hidden in Thorailles. After Jean Salazar's service to Louis XI of France at the Battle of Montlhéry (1465), Louis XI was determined to promote Salazar within the Catholic Church in France.

Salazar joined the Grandmontines, rising to become commendatory abbot of the Priory of Macheret near Saint-Just-Sauvage. He was appointed Bishop of Meaux on June 25, 1473. He became Archbishop of Sens on September 26, 1474.

As archbishop, Salazar presided over an Assembly of the French clergy held in 1475, calling for a crusade against the Turks and calling for a restoration of the Pragmatic Sanction of Bourges and the convening of an ecumenical council. He called a synod in Sens in August 1485 to confirm regulations passed by his predecessor, Louis de Melun. In July 1490, he was sent as an ambassador to England. A conflict with the cathedral chapter of Notre Dame de Paris in 1492 saw Salazar lose his right to preside at that cathedral. Also in 1492, he oversaw the fortification of Saint-Julien-du-Sault.

In 1498, he oversaw a commission that ordered the annulment of the marriage of Louis XII of France and Jeanne de France. In February 1499, he served as an ambassador to the Swiss Confederacy to seek an alliance in Louis XII's war against Maximilian I, Holy Roman Emperor. Louis XII appointed him to the Grand Conseil on May 13, 1502.

During the Italian Wars, in 1507 he accompanied Louis XII to fight against the Republic of Genoa. During the War of the League of Cambrai, he presided over a council at Pisa in May 1511 that purported to depose Pope Julius II. In 1514, he presided over the funeral of Anne of Brittany at the Basilica of St Denis; he presided over Louis XII's funeral there in 1515.

He died in Paris on February 11, 1518. He is buried in the nave of Sens Cathedral.

== Patronage ==
In 1479, he commissioned Francesco Florio to produce a copy of the Decretum Gratiani that is currently on display at the Bibliothèque de l'Arsenal.

Between 1475 and 1518, he oversaw the building of the Hôtel de Sens, which thereafter served as the Paris residence of the Archbishop of Sens.

He improved Sens Cathedral by commissioning the windows of the Last Judgment and the life of Saint Stephen. He added a memorial chapel dedicated to his parents in 1510. During the campaign against Genoa, he acquired a foot of Saint Stephen that he donated to the cathedral.

== See also ==
- Tristan de Salazar on French Wikipedia.

Catholic Church titles
Preceded by Louis de Melun	Archbishop of Sens; 1475–1518	Succeeded by Étienne de Poncher
