= Archdiocese of Sens =

Archdiocese of the Roman Catholic Church in France

Coordinates: 48.20°N 3.28°E

Archdiocese of Sens and Auxerre Archidioecesis Senonensis et Antissiodorensis Archidiocèse de Sens et Auxerre

Catholic
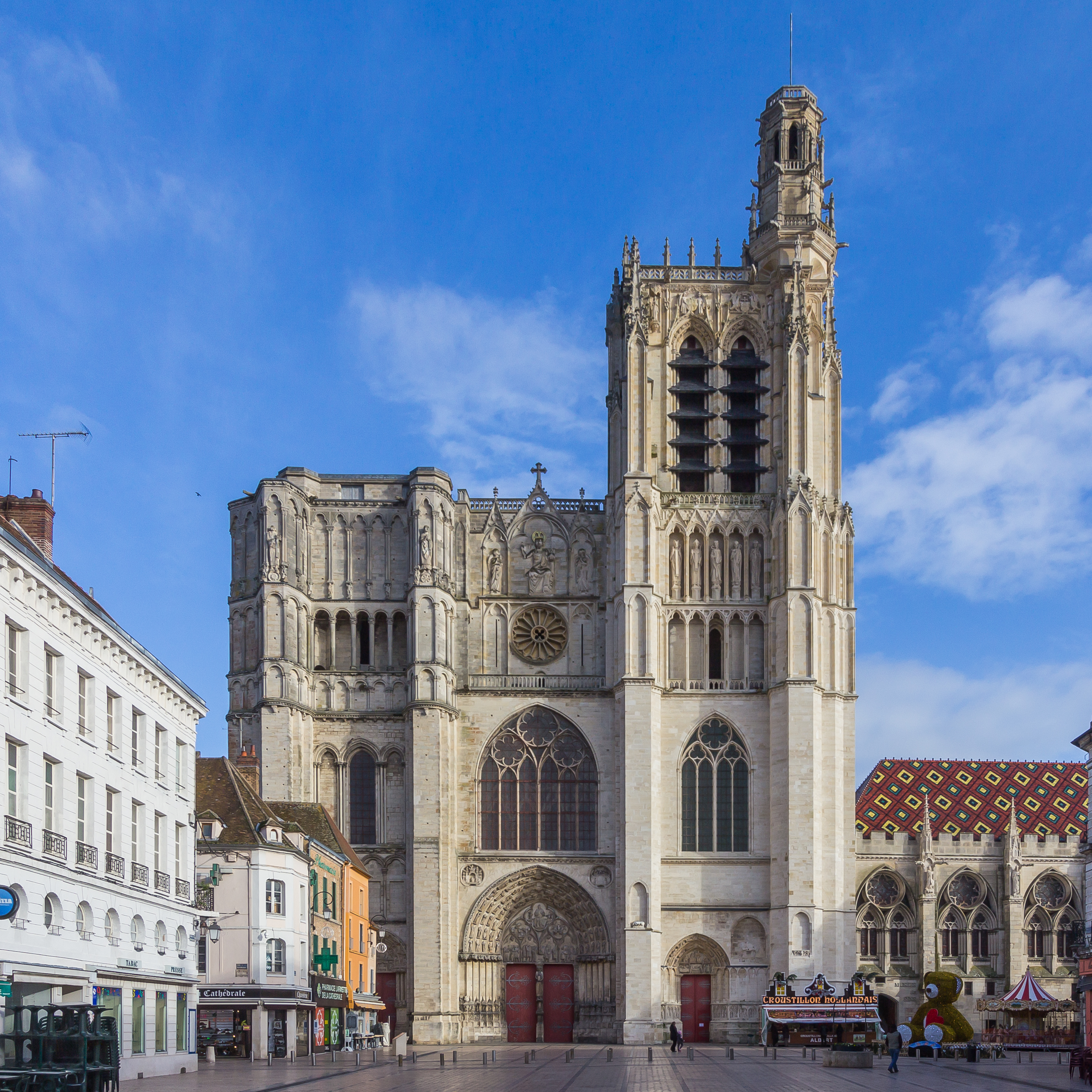
- Sens Cathedral

Location
- Country: France
- Ecclesiastical province: Dijon
- Metropolitan: Archdiocese of Dijon

Statistics
- Area: 7,460 km^{2} (2,880 sq mi)
- Population: Total; Catholics: (as of 2022); 340,514; 200,000 (58.7%)
- Parishes: 31

Information
- Denomination: Catholic
- Sui iuris church: Latin Church
- Rite: Roman Rite
- Established: 3 June 1823 (as archdiocese of sens and auxerre)
- Cathedral: Cathedral of St. Stephen in Sens
- Patron saint: St. Savinian and St. Potentian
- Secular priests: 49 (Diocesan); 14 (Religious Orders); 18 Permanent Deacons

Current leadership
- Pope: Leo XIV
- Archbishop: Pascal Wintzer
- Metropolitan Archbishop: Antoine Hérouard
- Bishops emeritus: Yves François Patenôtre

Map

Website
- Website of the Archdiocese

The Archdiocese of Sens and Auxerre (Latin: Archidioecesis Senonensis et Antissiodorensis; French: Archidiocèse de Sens et Auxerre) is a Latin archdiocese of the Catholic Church in France. The archdiocese comprises the department of Yonne, which is in the region of Burgundy.

Established in sub-apostolic times, according to late local legends, the diocese, as metropolis of the province of Quarta Lugdunensis, achieved ecclesiastical metropolitical status in the 7th century. For a time, the archbishop of Sens held the title "primate of the Gauls and Germania". The title was transferred to Lyon in the latter part of the 11th century.

After the creation of the archdiocese of Paris in 1622, the metropolitan archdiocese of Sens had three suffragan (subordinate) dioceses: Auxerre, Nevers and Troyes. The Diocese of Bethléem at Clamecy was also dependent on the metropolitan see of Sens. On 8 December 2002, as part of a general reorganization of the dioceses of France undertaken, at least in part, to respond to demographic changes, the Archdiocese of Sens-Auxerre ceased to have metropolitan rank and became a suffragan of the Archdiocese of Dijon, which became the centre of a new ecclesiastical province for the Burgundy administrative region.

== History ==
The history of the religious beginnings of the church at Sens dates from Savinian and Potentian, and through legend to the Dioceses of Chartres, Troyes and Orléans. Local legend claimed that the two were sent by Saint Peter himself (d. 68). Gregory of Tours is silent regarding Savinian and Potentian, alleged founders of the See of Sens; the Hieronymian Martyrology, which was revised before 600 at Auxerre (or Autun), ignores them. The cities of Chartres and Troyes have nothing about these men in their local liturgy prior to the 12th century, and that of Orléans nothing prior to the 15th, pertaining to the preaching of Altinus, Eodaldus and Serotinus (companions of Savinian and Potentian).

Before the ninth century there was (in the cemetery near the monastery of Pierre le Vif at Sens) a group of tombs, among which are those of the first bishops of Sens. In 847, the transfer of their remains to the church of St-Pierre le Vif inspired popular devotion towards Savinian and Potentian. In 848, Wandelbert of Prüm named them the first patrons of the church of Sens. Ado, in his martyrology published shortly afterwards, speaks of them as envoys of the apostles and as martyrs. The Martyrology of Usuard (around 875) depicts them as envoys of the "Roman pontiff" and martyrs. In the middle of the 10th century the relics of these two saints were hidden in a subterranean vault of the Abbey of St-Pierre le Vif to escape the pillage of the Hungarians, but in 1031 they were placed in a reliquary established by the monk Odoranne. This monk (in a chronicle published about 1045) speaks of Altinus, Eodaldus, and Serotinus as apostolic companions of Savinian and Potentian, but does not view them as legitimate.

In a document which (according to Henri Bouvier) dates from the end of the sixth century or the beginning of the seventh—but according to Louis Duchesne, who labels the Gerbertine legend as written in 1046 and 1079 under the inspiration of Gerbert, Abbot of St-Pierre le Vif—is first described a legend tracing to Savinian and Potentian (and their companions) the evangelization of the churches of Orléans, Chartres and Troyes. After some uncertainty, the legend became fixed in the Chronicle of pseudo-Clarius, compiled about 1120. The Christian faith could not have been preached at Sens in the second century, but Sidonius Apollinaris mentions that in 475 the Church of Sens had its 13th bishop; the list of bishops does not indicate that the episcopal see existed prior to the second half of the third century or the beginning of the fourth.

In the synod of Liptinae (diocese of Cambrai), held in May 743, Archbishop Boniface of Mainz, the papal legate in Germany, appointed three bishops: Grimo of Rouen, Abel of Reims, and Ardobert of Sens. The priest Deneardus was appointed messenger to carry the report of the synod to Rome, and to request the pope to grant the pallium to each of the prelates. In the meantime, something caused Boniface to change his mind about Abel and Ardobert, and he wrote to the pope, withdrawing his request for pallia for them. Surprised, Pope Zacharias replied in a letter of 23 September 843, granting Boniface's request for Grimo, and requested further details about the situation. But at the council of Soissons on 3 March 744, Pipin, Mayor of the Palace, had to request the council to grant canonical institution and possession of the dioceses of Reims and Sens. The council refused.

=== Councils of Sens ===
A large number of Church councils were held at Sens between 600 and 1485. The earliest perhaps involved a controversy over the date of Easter which Abbot Colombanus of Luxeuil (in the Vosges) refused to attend. In 1009, Archbishop Leotheric held a provincial synod, in the presence of King Robert I of France, to address the abuses of the abbey of S. Benoît de Fleury, which claimed exemption from diocesan control. The Council of 1140 condemned the writings of Abelard. The Council of 1198 was concerned with the Manichaean sect of the Poplicani.

=== Chapter and cathedral ===
The cathedral was dedicated in honor of Saint Stephen Protomartyr.

The cathedral was staffed and administered by a corporation called the Chapter, which consisted of five dignities (the archdeacon of Sens, the Treasurer, the Dean, the Precentor, and the Cellerar), of four personages (the archdeacon of Gatinais, the archdeacon of Melun, the archdeacon of Provins and the archdeacon d'Étampes), thirty-one canons, and fourteen semi-prebends. The archdeacons, the treasurer, and all the canons were appointments of the archbishop. The dean, the precentor, and the cellaerar were elected by the Chapter and confirmed by the pope. The Chapter had once been headed by a Provost, known since 961, but the office was suppressed and in 1176 the office was renamed "Dean".

On 2 January 876, Pope John VIII granted Bishop Ansegisius of Sens the office of papal vicar per Gallias et Germanias. At the council of Pontoise held by Charles the Bald in the same year, and on 14 July the papal legates and Archbishop Ansegisius attempted to have the Empire recognize the papal appointment as a primacy. There were many complaints from the bishops in attendance, and the question was raised again in the Emperor's presence on 16 July. It was ordered that "Ansegisius should have after the conclusion of the council exactly what he had at the beginning of it.

On 19 April 1079, Pope Gregory VII wrote to Archbishop Gebuin of Lyon, confirming for him and his successors the primacy of his archdiocese over the four provinces, Lyon, Rouen, Tours, and Sens. King Louis VI of France wrote to Pope Calixtus II (1119–1124), attempting to cajole him into releasing the province of Sens from subordination to the Primacy of Lyon. Lyon was, after all, in a different kingdom at the time. He did not succeed.

In 1537, one of the canons of the cathedral Chapter founded a collège in Sens, which was handed over to the Jesuits in 1623.

The major seminary of the diocese was founded in Sens in 1654, by Archbishop Louis-Henri de Pardaillan de Gondrin (1646–1674), and completed by his successor, Jean de Montpezat. and administered from 1667 by the Priests of the Mission.

==== Collegiate churches ====
The diocese of Sens was richly endowed with fifteen collegiate churches, all of which were closed at the Revolution and had their properties and incomes confiscated for the benefit of the State. The collegiate church of Nôtre-Dame d'Étampes, founded by King Robert I of France (866–922–923), was headed by a Cantor and had ten canons. Sainte-Croix d'Étampes, founded in 1183, had two dignities (a Dean and a Cantor) and nineteen canons. Nôtre-Dame de Melun had a Cantor and seven canons. Nôtre-Dame de Milly had four canons and was presided over by a Dean who was also the parish priest, who was presented for office to the archbishop by the local lord. The town of Provins had three collegiate churches: Saint-Quiriacus of the 10th century, administered by four dignities (dean, provost, cantor and treasurer) and twenty canons, all of whom except the dean were appointments of the king; Nôtre-Dame-du-Val, dating from 1171, headed by three dignities (dean, cantor, provost) and sixteen canons appointed alternately by the king and the archbishop; Saint-Nicolas, founded in 1218 and administered by a dean (elected by the Chapter) and nine canons. The collegiate church of Saint-Loup in Brienon-l'archévêque was headed by a treasurer and seven canons; the church of Saint-Pierre in Saint-Julien-du-Sault had a cantor and ten canons; the collegiate church of Saint Laurent at Ville-Folle had eight canons, presided over by a cantor and a treasurer. The church of Nôtre-Dame de Montereau had two dignities (a dean and a cantor) and nine canons who were appointed by the archbishop, except for the dean who was elected by the Chapter. The church of Nôtre-Dame at Bray-sur-Seine had three dignities (dean, treasurer, cantor) and ten canons appointed by the archbishop, while the dean was elective by the Chapter and the treasurer and cantor were appointed by the lords of Bray. The church of Sainte-Trinité at Trainel had six canons.

=== Restructuring of ecclesiastical system ===
Until 1622, the metropolitan archdiocese numbered seven suffragan (subordinate) dioceses: the dioceses of Chartres, Auxerre, Meaux, Paris, Orléans, Nevers and Troyes. On 20 October 1622, Pope Gregory XV issued the bull "Universi Orbis," creating the metropolitan archdiocese of Paris, and assigning it four suffragan diocese which had belonged to Sens. The diocese of Sens was left with only three suffragan (subordinate) dioceses: Auxerre, Nevers and Troyes. Complaints and conflict with Paris and Lyon continued, however, for another half-century. In 1668, the income of the abbey of Mont Saint-Martin in the Diocese of Cambrai was added to the income (mensa) of the archbishop.

Before the Revolution, the diocese of Sens contained 774 parishes, with approximately 158,700 inhabitants. It was claimed, after the revocation of the Edict of Nantes, that there was only one Protestant family remaining. There were sixteen parishes inside the city of Sens, and thirteen of the curés of those parishes had the title of "cardinal priest", who assisted the archbishop when he celebrated Mass pontifically in the cathedral.

Until the French Revolution, when all titles of nobility were abolished, the archbishop of Sens was also viscount of Sens. In the 16th century, the archbishops were mostly absentee landlords. Cardinal Antoine Duprat (1525–1535), who was Chancellor of France and also first-minister of King Francis I, never visited Sens. Cardinal Louis de Bourbon-Vendôme (1535–1557) lived at the royal court. Cardinal Jean Bertrand (1557–1560) held the office of Garde des Sceaux, and died as ambassador in Venice without ever having made his entry into the diocese of Sens. Cardinal Nicolas de Pellevé (1562–1592) was occupied with the Council of Trent, and then lived at the papal court. Archbishop Renaud de Beaune (1595–1606) did not receive his bulls of installation until 1602.

=== French Revolution ===
Even before it directed its attention to the Church directly, the National Constituent Assembly attacked the institution of monasticism. On 13 February 1790. it issued a decree which stated that the government would no longer recognize solemn religious vows taken by either men or women. In consequence, Orders and Congregations which lived under a Rule were suppressed in France. Members of either sex were free to leave their monasteries or convents if they wished, and could claim an appropriate pension by applying to the local municipal authority.

The National Constituent Assembly ordered the replacement of political subdivisions of the ancien régime with subdivisions called "departments", to be characterized by a single administrative city in the center of a compact area. The decree was passed on 22 December 1789, the boundaries fixed on 26 February 1790, with the institution to be effective on 4 March 1790. A new department was created called "Yonne," and Sens became the principal city in the department. The National Constituent Assembly then, on 6 February 1790, instructed its ecclesiastical committee to prepare a plan for the reorganization of the clergy. At the end of May, its work was presented as a draft Civil Constitution of the Clergy, which, after vigorous debate, was approved on 12 July 1790. There was to be one diocese in each department, requiring the suppression of approximately fifty dioceses. Sens became the seat of the "diocese of Yonne," in the metropolitanate of Paris. Cardinal Étienne Charles Loménie de Brienne, former Chief Minister of France, took the required oath to the Constitution on 30 January 1791, and became the Constitutional Bishop of the Yonne. He was in a state of schism with the Catholic Church.

=== Reconstruction ===
The French Directory fell in the coup engineered by Talleyrand and Napoleon on 10 November 1799. The coup resulted in the establishment of the French Consulate, with Napoleon as the First Consul. To advance his aggressive military foreign policy, he decided to make peace with the Catholic Church and the Papacy. In the concordat of 1801 between the French Consulate, headed by First Consul Napoleon Bonaparte, and Pope Pius VII, and in the enabling papal bull, "Qui Christi Domini", the diocese of Yonne (Sens) and all the other dioceses in France, were suppressed. This removed all the institutional contaminations and novelties introduced by the Constitutional Church. The diocesan structure was then re-established by the papal bull "Qui Christi Domini" of 29 November 1801, but Sens was not one of the restored dioceses. The Concordat was registered as a French law on 8 April 1802.

The territory of the former archdiocese of Sens and that of the former Auxerre was annexed to the Roman Catholic Diocese of Troyes. The somewhat complex agreement gave the title of bishop of Auxerre to the bishops of Troyes, and the purely honorary title of archbishop of Sens to the archbishop of Paris, the metropolitan archbishop the diocese of Troyes (departments of Aube and Yonne).

==== The French monarchy restored ====
In 1814, the French monarchy was restored, and on 24 May 1814, the pope returned to Rome from exile in Savona. Work began immediately on a new concordat, to regularize the relations between the two parties. In implementation of the concordat of 27 July 1817, between King Louis XVIII and Pope Pius VII, the papal bull "Commissa nobis" was issued on 27 July 1817, but the French Parliament refused to ratify the concordat. It was not until 6 October 1822 that a revised version of the papal bull, now called "Paternae Charitatis", fortified by an ordonnance of Louis XVIII of 13 January 1823 ordering its registration, received the acceptance of all parties.

"Commissa nobis" of 1817 reestablished the Archdiocese of Sens and the Diocese of Auxerre, but this arrangement did not go into effect. The papal bull "Paternae charitatis" of 27 July 1821, the pontifical brief of 4 September 1821, and the royal ordinance of 19 October 1821, agreeing to the suppression of the Diocese of Auxerre, and assigning to the Archdiocese of Sens the Department of the Yonne and, as suffragans, the Dioceses of Troyes, Nevers and Moulins. A papal brief of 3 June 1823 gave to the archbishop of Sens the additional title of bishop of Auxerre.

By a royal ordonnance of 26 March 1823, King Louis XVIII authorized Archbishop de la Fare to establish a seminary. The city of Auxerre offered a set of buildings for the opening of a minor seminary.

Under the second French empire of Napoleon III the archbishop of Sens had three vicars-general, who required governmental approval before appointment. The cathedral Chapter was reconstituted with eleven titular canons (including the archpriest of Saint-Étienne and the superior of the major seminary; there were, in addition,"canons of honor" (archbishops or bishops), and "honorary canons" (whether residential or not).

The archbishop of Sens-Auxerre continued to reside at Sens until the 1920s, but is now resident at Auxerre, while his cathedra (seat) is at Sens Cathedral. The distance between Sens and Auxerre is around 31 miles (50 km) by train.

== Bishops and archbishops ==
=== Before 800 AD ===
- (346) : Severinus
- (356–387) : Ursicinus
- (c. 460) : Ambrose
- (c. 465–487) : Agroecius (Agrice)
- Heraclius (487–515)
- (515–525) : Paul
- (533, 541) : Leo
- (549, 573) : Constitutus of Sens
- (579–609) : Arthemius
- (c. 609–623) : Lupus
- (627) : Mederius
- Hildegarius
- (c. 639) : Annobertus

[ Gondelbert (c. 642–643) ]

- (650, 654) : Armentarius
- (654–657) : Arnulfus
- (658–675) : Emmon

[ Amatus (Amé) (c. 676)]

- (692–695) : Wulfram of Sens
- (c. 696) : Giricus (Gerie), the first archbishop
- (711, 731) : Ebbo
- Merulf
- (744) : Hartbert
- (c. 757, 762) : Lupus
- (769) : Wilchar

=== 800 to 1000 ===
- (797–817) : Magnus
- (818? –828) : Jeremias
- (829–836) : Alderic
- (837–865) : Wenilo (837–865)
- (865–870) : Eigil
- (871–883) : Ansegisus
- (884–887) : Evrard
- (887–923) : Walter
- (923–927) : Gauthier
- (927–932) : Autald
- (932–938) : Guillaume
- (938–954) : Gerlair
- (954–958) : Hildeman
- (958–967) : Archambaud
- (967–976) : Anastasius
- (976–999) : Sevinus

=== 1000–1200 ===
- (999–1032) : Leotheric
- (1032–1049) : Gelduinus
- (1049–1062) : Mainard
- (1062–1096) : Richerius
- (1098–1122) : Daimbert
- (1122–1142) : Henri Sanglier
- (1142–1168) : Hugues de Toucy
- (1168–1176) : Guillaume aux Blanches Mains
- (1176–1193) : Gui de Noyers
- (1194–1199) : Michel de Corbeil

=== 1200–1500 ===
- (1200–1222) : Peter of Corbeil
- (1222–1241) : Gauthier Cornu
- (1244–1254) : Gilles Cornu
- (1254–1257) : Henri Cornu
- (1258–1267) : Guillaume de Brosse
- (1267–1274) : Pierre de Charny
- (1274) :Pierre d'Anisy
- (1275–1292) :Gilles Cornu
- (1292–2309) : Étienne Béquart de Penil
- (1309–1316) : Philippe Leportier de Marigny
- (1317–1329) : Guillaume de Melun
- (1329–1330) : Pierre Roger, later Pope Clement VI (1342–1352)
- (1330–1338) : Guillaume de Brosse
- (1339–1344) : Philippe de Melun
- (1344–1375) : Guillaume de Melun
- (1376–1385) : Ademar Robert
- (1385) : Gonterus de Baigneux Avignon Obedience
- (1385–1390) : Guy de Roye Avignon Obedience
- (1390–1405) : Guillaume de Dormans Avignon Obedience
- (1406–1415) : Jean de Montaigu Avignon Obedience
- (1416–1422) : Henri de Savoisy
- (1422–1432) : Jean Nanton
- (1432–1474) : Louis de Melun
- (1475–1519) : Tristan de Salazar

=== 1500–1800 ===
- (1519–1524) : Étienne de Poncher
- (1525–1535) : Antoine Duprat (made cardinal in 1527)
- (1535–1557) : Louis de Bourbon-Vendôme (cardinal from 1517)
- (1557–1560) : Jean Bertrand (cardinal in 1559)
- (1560–1562) : Louis de Lorraine (Cardinal de Guise from 1553)
- (1562–1592) : Nicolas de Pellevé (cardinal from 1570)
- (1595–1606) : Renaud de Beaune
- (1606–1618) : Jacques Davy Duperron
- (1618–1621) : Jean Davy du Perron
- (1621–1646) : Octave de Saint-Lary de Bellegarde
- (1646–1674) : Louis-Henri de Pardaillan de Gondrin
- (1674–1685) : Jean de Montpezat de Carbon
- (1685–1715) : Hardouin Fortin de la Hoguette
- (1716–1730) : Denis-François le Bouthillier de Chavigny
- (1730–1753) : Jean-Joseph Languet de Gergy
- (1753–1788) : Paul d'Albert de Luynes
- (1788–1793) : Étienne-Charles de Loménie de Brienne

=== 1800–present ===
- (1821–1829) : Anne Louis Henri de La Fare (1821–1829)
- (1829–1843) : Jean-Joseph-Marie-Victoire de Cosnac

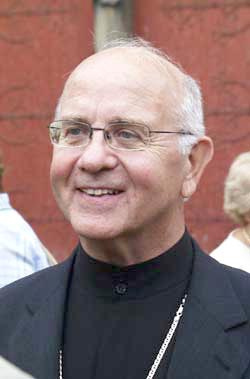
Archbishop Patenôtre

- (1843) : Charles André Toussaint Bruno Raimond de la Lande
- (1844–1867) : Mellon de Jolly
- (1867–1891) : Victor-Félix Bernadou
- (1892–1911) : Pierre-Marie-Etienne-Gustave Ardin
- (1912–1931) : Jean-Victor-Emile Chesnelong
- (1932–1935) : Maurice Feltin (became Archbishop of Bordeaux)
- (1936–1962) : Frédéric Edouard Camille Lamy
- (1962–1977) : René-Louis-Marie Stourm
- (1977–1990) : Eugène-Marie Ernoult
- (1990–1995) : Gérard Denis Auguste Defois (became Archbishop of Reims)
- (1996–2004) : Georges Edmond Robert Gilson
- (2004–2015) : Yves François Patenôtre
- (2015–2024) : Hervé Giraud
- (6 Aug 2024–present) : Pascal Jean Marcel Wintzer

== Bibliography ==
=== Reference works for bishops ===
- Gams, Pius Bonifatius (1873). Series episcoporum Ecclesiae catholicae: quotquot innotuerunt a beato Petro apostolo (in Latin). Ratisbon: Typis et Sumptibus Georgii Josephi Manz. pp. 628–630.
- Eubel, Conradus, ed. (1913). Hierarchia catholica (in Latin). Vol. 1 (Tomus I) (second ed.). Münster: Libreria Regensbergiana.
- Eubel, Conradus, ed. (1914). Hierarchia catholica (in Latin). Vol. 2 (Tomus II) (second ed.). Münster: Libreria Regensbergiana. archived
- Eubel, Conradus; Gulik, Guilelmus, eds. (1923). Hierarchia catholica (in Latin). Vol. 3 (Tomus III) (second ed.). Münster: Libreria Regensbergiana.
- Gauchat, Patritius (Patrice) (1935). Hierarchia catholica. Vol. 4 (Tomus IV) (1592–1667). Münster: Libraria Regensbergiana.
- Ritzler, Remigius; Sefrin, Pirminus (1952). Hierarchia catholica medii et recentis aevi. Vol. 5 (Tomus V) (1667–1730). Patavii: Messagero di S. Antonio.
- Ritzler, Remigius; Sefrin, Pirminus (1958). Hierarchia catholica medii et recentis aevi. Vol. 6 (Tomus VI) (1730–1799). Patavii: Messagero di S. Antonio.
- Ritzler, Remigius; Sefrin, Pirminus (1968). Hierarchia Catholica medii et recentioris aevi (in Latin). Vol. VII (1800–1846). Monasterii: Libreria Regensburgiana.
- Remigius Ritzler; Pirminus Sefrin (1978). Hierarchia catholica Medii et recentioris aevi (in Latin). Vol. VIII (1846–1903). Il Messaggero di S. Antonio.
- Pięta, Zenon (2002). Hierarchia catholica medii et recentioris aevi (in Latin). Vol. IX (1903–1922). Padua: Messagero di San Antonio. ISBN 978-88-250-1000-8.

=== Studies ===
- Boislisle, A.M. de (1881) L'état dse généralités dressés pour l'instruction du duc de Bourgogne. (in French). Tome 1: Mémoire de la généralité de Paris (Paris: Imprimerie nationale 1881. [Report of 1700. Includes diocese of Sens, pp. 42–63; 142; 149; 154; 296; 722; 799]
- Bouvier, Henri. Histoire de l'église et de l'ancien archidiocèse de Sens. (in French). Paris-Sens: Picard-Yvert. Volume 1 (1906). Volume 2 (1911). Volume 3 (1911).
- Bresse, J.M. (1913). Abbayes et prieures de l'ancienne France: recueil historique des archevêchés, évêchés, abbayes et prieurés de France. (in French). Volume 15. Paris: A. Picard, 1913.
- Chartraire, Eugène (1904). Cartulaire du Chapitre de Sens. (in French and Latin). Sens: Duchemin, 1904.
- Duchesne, Louis (1910). Fastes épiscopaux de l'ancienne Gaule: II. L'Aquitaine et les Lyonnaises. Paris: Fontemoing. Archived. pp. 393–418.
- Fisquet, Honoré (1868). La France pontificale (Gallia christiana). Sens et Auxerre: Métropole de Sens. (in French). Paris: E. Repos 1868.
- Jean, Armand (1891). Les évêques et les archevêques de France depuis 1682 jusqu'à 1801 (in French). Paris: A. Picard. p. 363.
- Pisani, Paul (1907). Répertoire biographique de l'épiscopat constitutionnel (1791–1802) (in French). Paris: A. Picard et fils.
- Sainte-Marthe, Denis (1770). Gallia christiana, in provincias ecclesiasticas distributa Volume 12. (in Latin). Paris: Typographia Regia 1770.
- Société bibliographique (France) (1907). L'épiscopat français depuis le Concordat jusqu'à la Séparation (1802–1905). Paris: Librairie des Saints-Pères.
- Tabbagh, Vincent (ed.) (2010): Fasti Ecclesiae Gallicanae. Répertoire prosopographique des évêques, dignitaires et chanoines des diocèses de France de 1200 à 1500. XI. Diocèse de Sens. Turnhout, Brepols
