= Avitus (disambiguation) =

Avitus was a Roman emperor. The term also may refer to:

- Avitus of Braga, 5th-century literary priest of Braga
- Alphius Avitus (flourished 1st century BC & 1st century), Latin poet
- Gaius Julius Avitus Alexianus, Syrian aristocrat (flourished 2nd century & 3rd century)
- Avitus Marinianus, Roman senator and consul in 423
- Avitus of Vienne (450–517), Latin bishop, poet and saint
- Avitus I of Clermont, 6th-century bishop of Clermont and saint
- Avitus II of Clermont, 7th-century bishop of Clermont and saint
- Avitus of Rouen, 4th-century bishop of Rouen and saint
- Avitus (spider), a genus of jumping spiders
- Avitus, a major character in the game Dawn of War II, set in the Warhammer 40,000 universe

== See also ==
- Saint Avitus (disambiguation)
