= Saint Avitus =

Saint Avitus may refer to:

- Avitus I of Clermont, 6th-century bishop of Clermont
- Avitus II of Clermont, 7th-century bishop of Clermont
- Avitus of Vienne 5th–6th century bishop of Vienne
- Avitianus, or Avitus of Rouen, 4th-century bishop of Rouen
- Avit du Périgord (Avitus of Perigord), 5th–6th century monk
- Avit de Micy (Avitus of Micy), 6th century abbot

== See also ==
- Avitus (disambiguation)
