= Basilica of Notre-Dame du Port =

Basilica in Puy-de-Dôme, France

Coordinates: 45°46′50.5″N 3°5′22″E

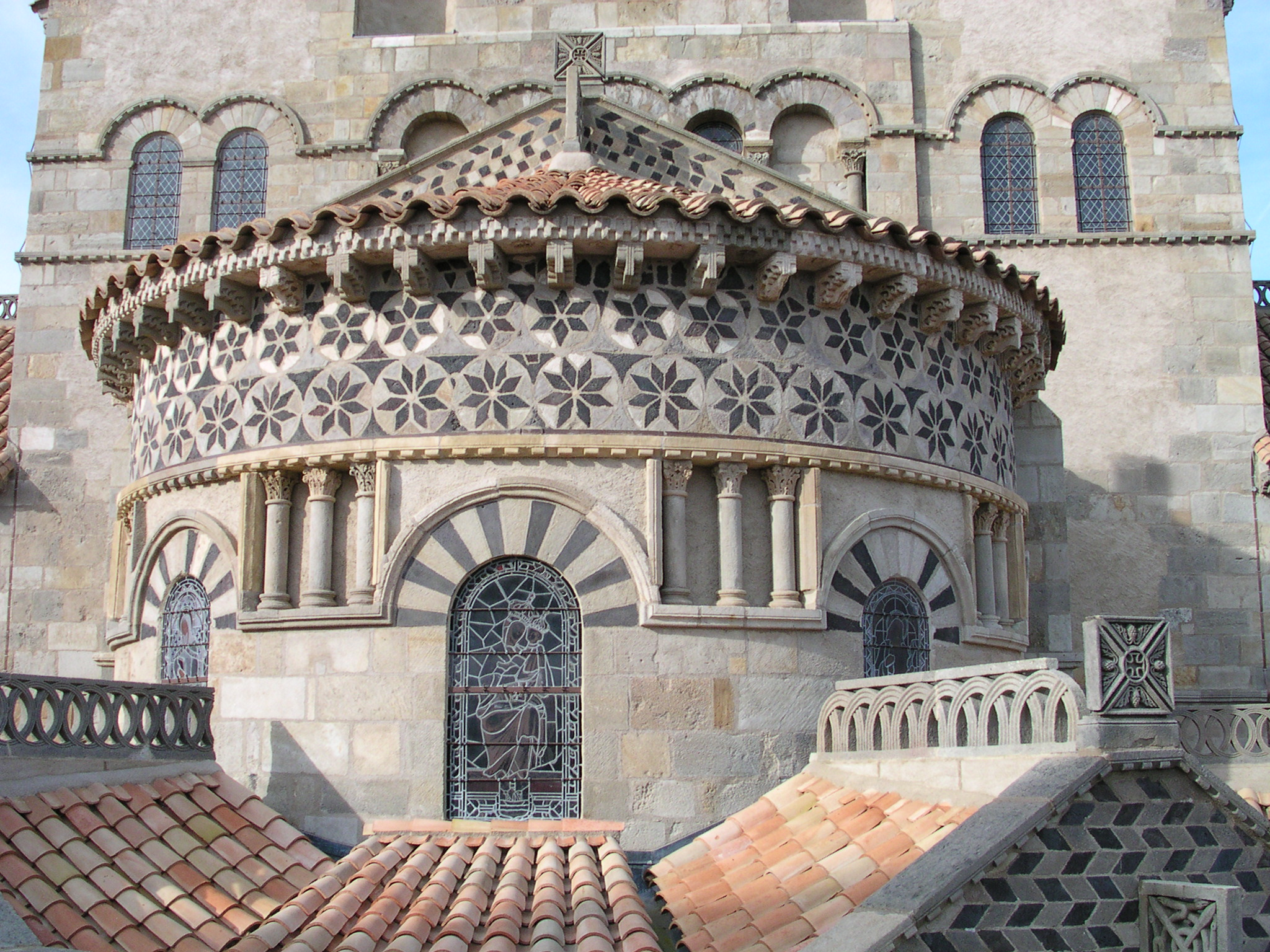
Chevet and mosaics

The Basilica of Notre-Dame du Port is a Romanesque basilica, formerly a collegiate church, in the Port quarter of Clermont-Ferrand, between Place Delille and the cathedral. From the 10th century to the French Revolution it was served by a community of canons, regular until the 13th century, and thereafter secular.

== History ==
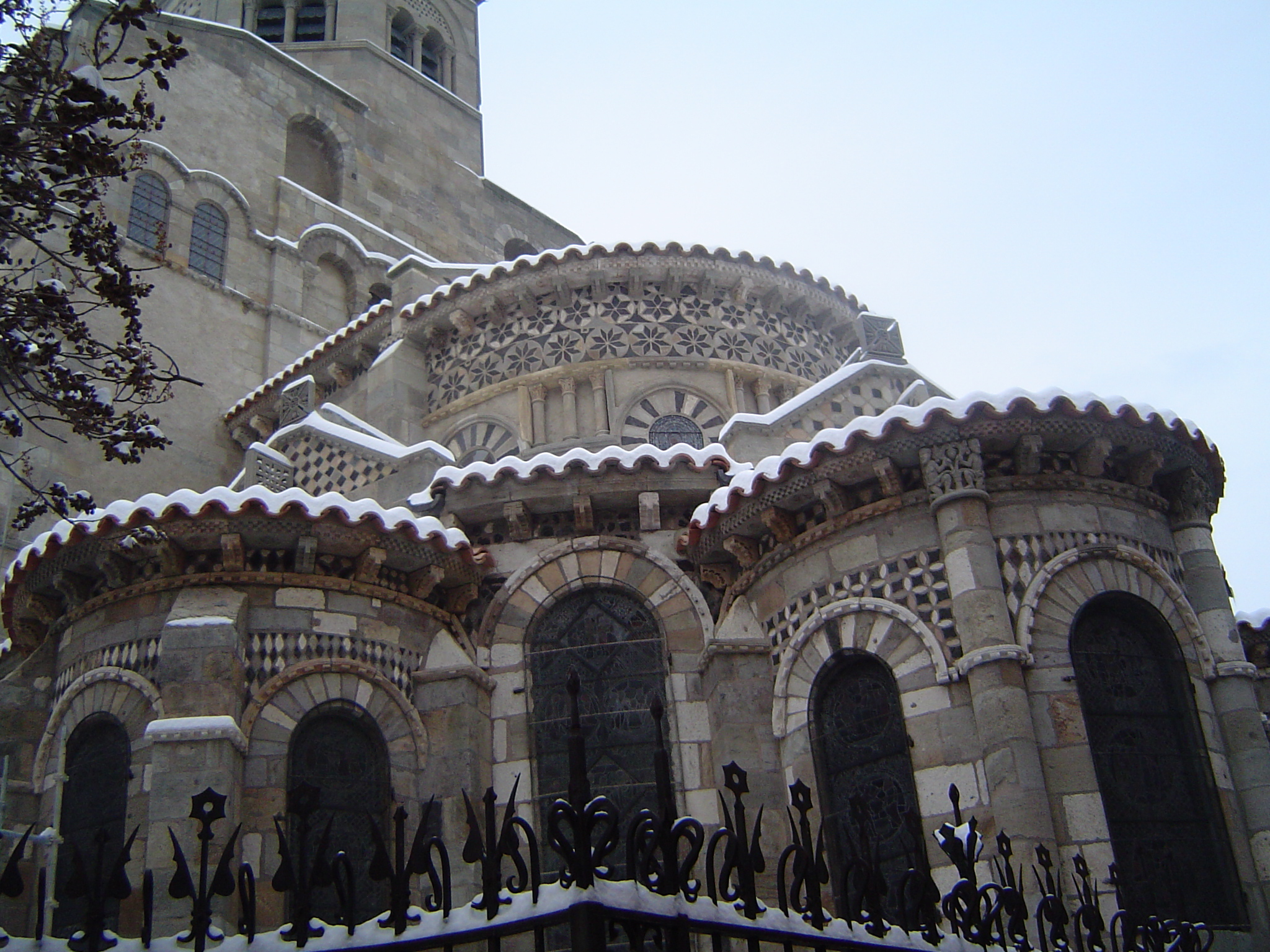
Chevet under snow

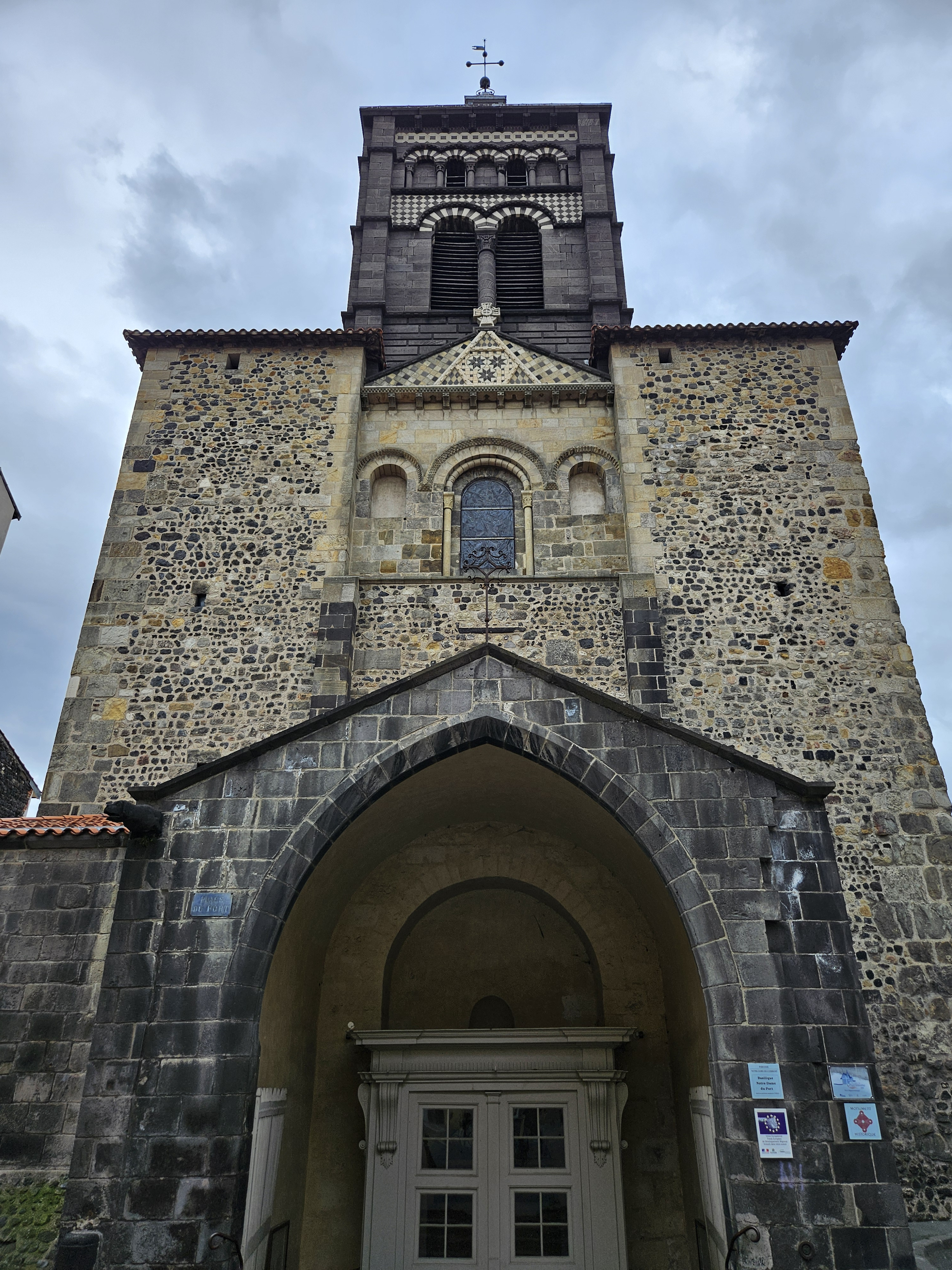
West door

According to tradition, the church was founded by the Bishop of Clermont, Avitus of Clermont, in the 6th century and was rebuilt in the 11th or 12th century after being burned down by the Normans. The establishment here of a community of canons took place no earlier than the middle of the 10th century, under bishop Étienne II of Clermont.

The church was formally declared a basilica minor on 3 May 1886.

In the 19th century, the bell tower was added, and the Romanesque roof tiles were replaced by lava slabs. These have since been removed again and the roof restored as near as possible to its original state. A major restoration programme took place in the church interior between 2007 and 2008, consisting of the cleaning of all the stonework, the removal of cement pointing from the restoration of the 19th century, the restoration of the pictures and the replacement of the lustres (the crypt however was not included).

On Sunday 7 December 2008, the statue of Notre-Dame du Port ("Our Lady of the Port") was reinstalled in the church, having been kept safe in Clermont Cathedral during the restoration works, thus marking the reopening of the building to the public.

In 1998 the Basilica of Notre-Dame du Port was added to the UNESCO World Heritage list as part of the Routes of Santiago de Compostela in France.

The name "du Port" supposedly comes from the fact that the church was built in the "port" district, in Latin portus, here in the sense of "market" rather than "seaport". The church at first bore the name of Sainte-Marie-Principale; the description Portus or du Port is not known before the 11th century. Nor was the Port district, at least in the Middle Ages, a particularly commercial one: the districts of Saint-Pierre and Saint-Genès were much more so.

== Description ==
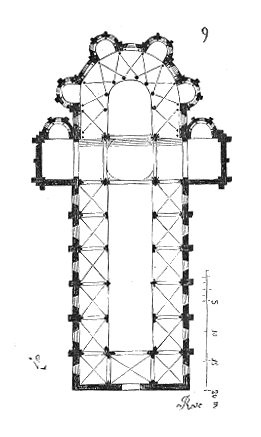
Plan from Dictionnaire raisonné de l'architecture française du XIe au XVIe siècle, by Eugène Viollet-le-Duc, 1856

The basilica is one of the five Romanesque churches in Auvergne known as the "greater" churches (majeures), the others being the church of Saint-Austremoine in Issoire, the Basilica of Notre-Dame of Orcival, the church of Saint-Nectaire, and the church of Saint-Saturnin.

Built of arkose, a sort of sandstone, the building has an almost perfect harmony supposedly resulting from the application of the ratio of the Golden Number.

The church is built on a Latin cross ground plan with a nave of six bays between two low side aisles with simple vaults. There is a transept with a semi-circular chapel on each arm, and a quire surrounded by an ambulatory from which open four radiating chapel, none of them on the main axis, thus forming a chevet, which with its fine mosaics is a notable example of the Romanesque art of Auvergne. The capitals, which are among the finest in Auvergne, principally depict scenes from the Bible, but also some from the Psychomachia of Prudentius.

== Gallery ==
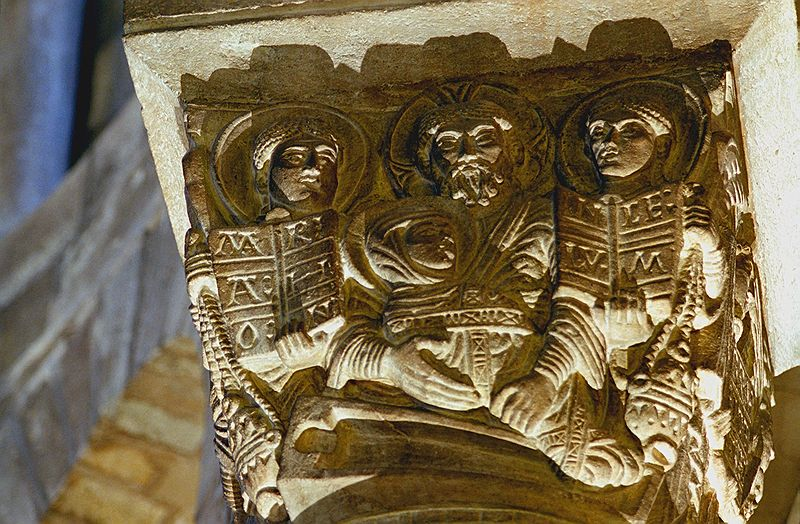
Dormition and Assumption of the Virgin

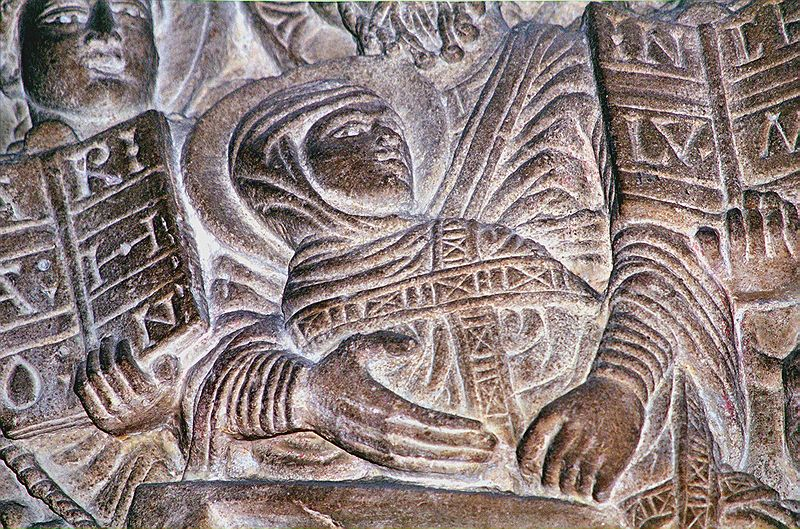
Detail of the Assumption

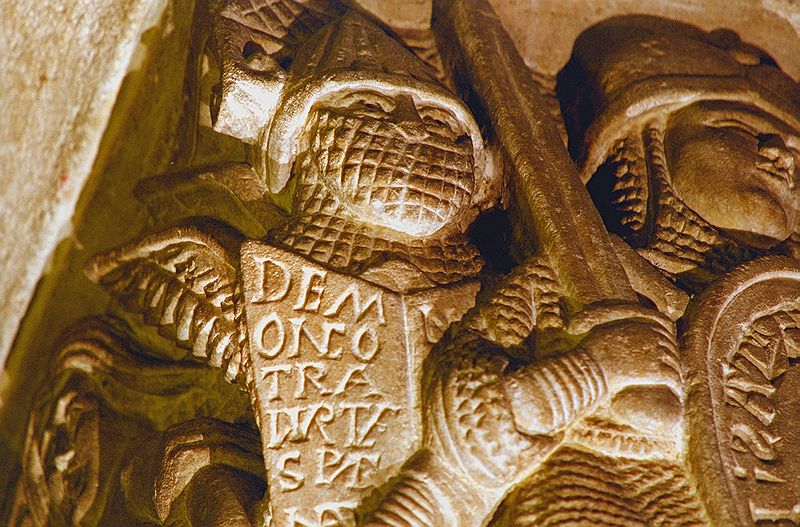
Detail of a capital

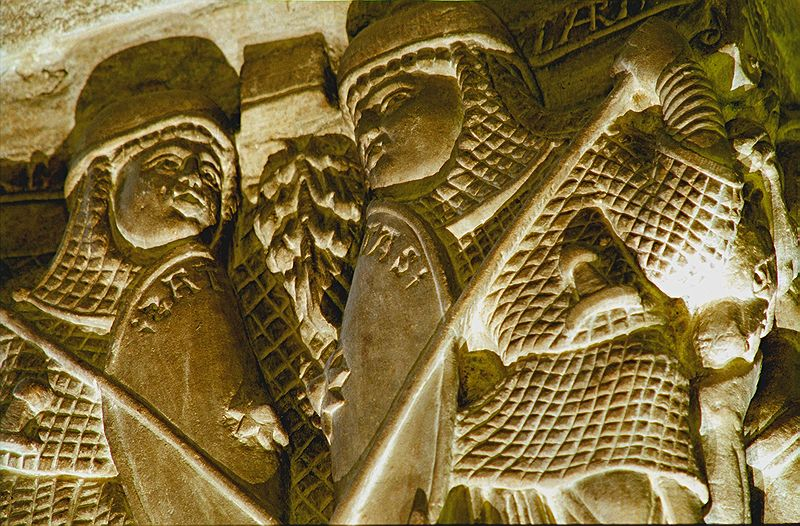
Detail of a capital

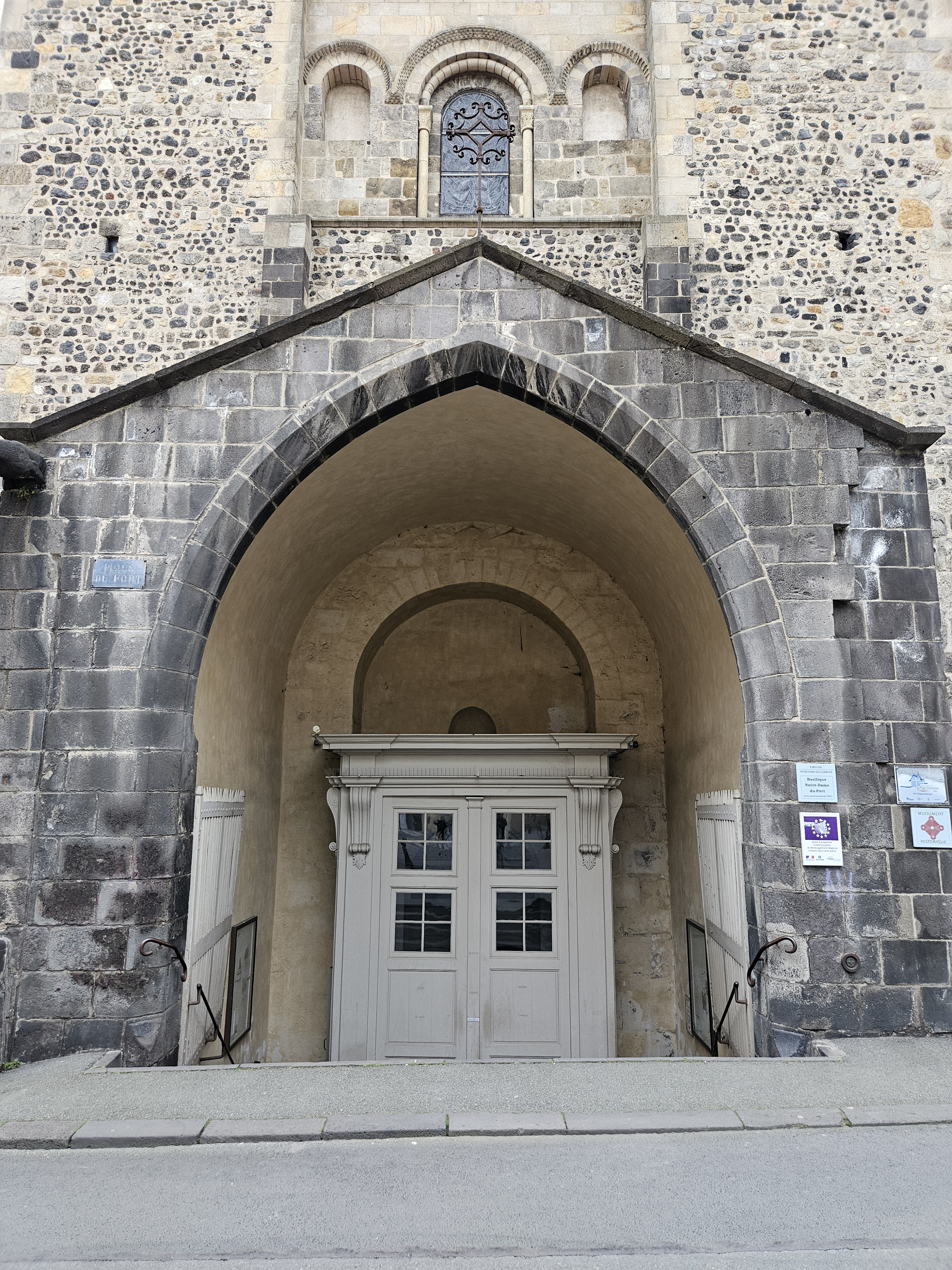
West Door

== See also ==
- High medieval domes

== Bibliography ==
- Bréhier, nd: La sculpture romane en Haute-Auvergne, RHA, vol. 23
- Collière, Guy, nd: Art roman en Basse-Auvergne - les églises majeures. Livret détaillé disponible dans certaines des cinq églises majeures d'Auvergne
- Craplet, Bernard, 1992, Auvergne romane, Éditions Zodiaque, revised edition
- Fornas, 1997, Le symbolisme dans l'art roman, La Taillanderie
- Fornas, 1994, Églises romanes de Basse-Auvergne, La Taillanderie
- Mourlevat, La géométrie du Nombre d'Or à Notre-Dame du Port, in Bulletin historique et scientifique de l'Auvergne, Jul-Sept 1978
- Porcher, 1968, Bestiaire roman Auvergnat, RHA, vol. 41
