= Guy of la Tour du Pin =

- Bishop of Clermont
- In office: 1250 - 1286
- Predecessor: Hugh of La Tour-du-Pin
- Successor: Aimar of Cros

Personal details
- Born: c. 1232
- Died: 1286
- Parents: Albert III, lord of La Tour-du-Pin; Beatrix of Coligny

Guy de la Tour (c. 1232 - 1286) was the Bishop of Clermont from 1250 until his death.

== Life ==
Guy de la Tour was the son of Albert III, lord of La Tour-du-Pin and Beatrix of Coligny. He was also the nephew of his predecessor, Hugues de la Tour. He entered the order of preachers at 15 and became bishop of Clermont at 18, in 1250, reportedly at the request of Louis IX. He was consecrated in 1253. He was the second bishop of Clermont to have his election confirmed by the Archbishops of Bourges. In 1254 he received Louis IX in church after his return from the Holy Land.

On the 28th of May 1262, Louis IX came to Clermont to celebrate the marriage of his son Philip to Isabella of Aragon.

In 1267, Clément IV sent Guy and harsh letter regarding his confiscation of lands belonging to Obazine Abbey. This led to Clement not granting Guy the archbishopric of Lyon the following year.

In 1269, he pledged alliance to the king to earn his protection. He, in turn, recognized his rights on the city of Clermont.

In 1278, he attended the council of Aurillac.

In 1283, he received the pastoral visit of the archbishop of Bruges, Simon de Sully.

He continued the construction of the Clermont-Ferrand Cathedral.

He died the 28th of February 1286, in Ouzoir.
