= Archdiocese of Clermont =

Catholic archdiocese in France

Coordinates: 45.78°N 3.09°E

Archdiocese of Clermont Archidioecesis Claromontana Archidiocèse de Clermont

Catholic
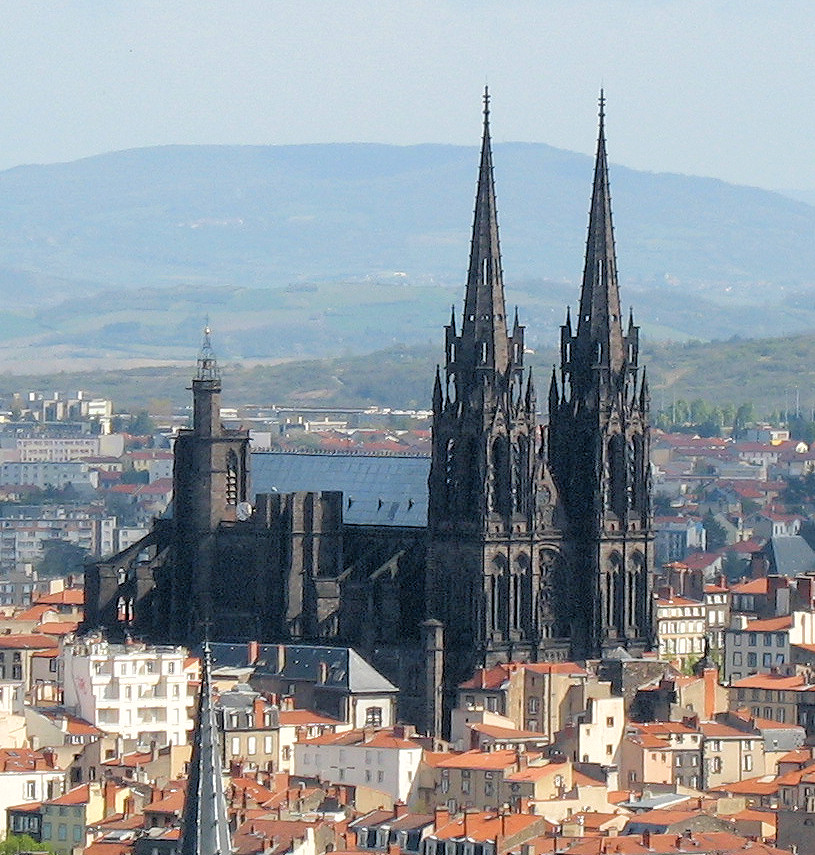
- Clermont-Ferrand Cathedral

Location
- Country: France
- Ecclesiastical province: Clermont

Statistics
- Area: 8,016 km^{2} (3,095 sq mi)
- Population: Total; Catholics: (as of 2021); 636,000 (est.) ▲; 616,000 (est.) ▲

Information
- Denomination: Roman Catholic
- Sui iuris church: Latin Church
- Rite: Roman Rite
- Established: 3rd Century (As Diocese of Auvergne); 8 December 2002 (As Archdiocese of Clermont)
- Cathedral: Cathedral of Notre Dame in Clermont-Ferrand
- Patron Saint: Saint Austremonius of Clermont
- Secular priests: 83 (diocesan) ▼10 (Religious Orders); 35 Permanent Deacons

Current leadership
- Pope: Leo XIV
- Metropolitan Archbishop: François Kalist
- Suffragans: Diocese of Le Puy-en-Velay; Diocese of Moulins; Diocese of Saint-Flour

Map

Website
- Website of the Archdiocese

Ecclesiastical province of Clermont

The Archdiocese of Clermont (Latin: Archidioecesis Claromontana; French: Archidiocèse de Clermont) is a Latin archdiocese of the Roman Catholic Church in France. The diocese comprises the department of Puy-de-Dôme, in the Region of Auvergne. The Archbishop's seat is Clermont-Ferrand Cathedral. Throughout its history Clermont was the senior suffragan of the Archdiocese of Bourges. It became a metropolitan see itself, however, in 2002. The current archbishop is François Kalist.

At first very extensive, the diocese lost Haute-Auvergne in 1317 through the reorganization of the structure of bishoprics in southern France and Aquitaine by Pope John XXII, resulting in the creation of the diocese of Saint-Flour. In 1822, in the reorganization of French dioceses by Pope Pius VII, following the restoration of the Bourbon monarchy, the diocese of Clermont lost the Bourbonnais, on account of the erection of the diocese of Moulins. Since the reorganization in 2002 by Pope John Paul II, there are now four dioceses in the province of Clermont: Clermont, Le Puy-en-Velay, Moulins, and Saint-Flour.

== History ==
The first bishop of Clermont was Saint Austremonius (Stramonius). Historical accounts differ regarding his era: One is a local tradition that considers him one of the Seventy Disciples of Christ, while Gregory of Tours considers him one of the missionaries who arrived in Gaul about 250. According to local tradition he was one of the Disciples of Christ, by birth a Jew, who came with Saint Peter from Palestine to Rome and subsequently became the Apostle of Auvergne, Berry, Nivernais, and Limousin. At Clermont he is said to have converted the senator Cassius and the pagan priest Victorinus, to have sent Saint Sirenatus (Cerneuf) to Thiers, Saint Marius to Salers, Saint Nectarius (Nectaire) and Saint Antoninus into other parts of Auvergne, and to have been beheaded in 92. This tradition is based on a life of Saint Austremonius written in the tenth century in the Mozac Abbey, where the body of the saint had rested from 761, and rewritten by the monks of Issoire, who retained the saint's head. Gregory of Tours, born in Auvergne in 544 and well versed in the history of that country, looks upon Austremonius as one of the seven missionaries who, about 250, evangelized Gaul; he relates how the body of the saint was first interred at Issoire, being there the object of great veneration.

Among the bishops of Clermont should also be mentioned: Pierre de Cros (1301–04), engaged by Thomas Aquinas to complete his Summa; Étienne Aubert (1340–42), later Pope Innocent VI (1352–62); Guillaume du Prat (1528–60), founder of the Clermont College in Paris, and delegate of Francis I of France to the Council of Trent; and Massillon, the illustrious orator (1717–42).

Several famous Jansenists were natives of Clermont: Blaise Pascal, author of the Pensées (1623–62); the Arnauld family, and Jean Soanen (1647–1740), Bishop of Senez, famous for his stubborn opposition to the Bull "Unigenitus". On the other hand, the city of Riom in the diocese of Clermont was the birthplace of Jacques Sirmond, the learned Jesuit (1559–1651), Confessor to Louis XIII and editor of the volumes on the ancient councils of Gaul.

Other natives worth mention were the Abbé Jacques Delille, poet and Academician (1738–1813); and François Dominique de Reynaud, Comte de Montlosier, the publicist (1755–1838), who was a member of the Estates General of 1789 for Clermont-Ferrand and a Royalist in the convention, famous for his memoir against the Jesuits and for his being refused a Catholic burial by Bishop Ferou. The famous Jesuit paleontologist and philosopher Pierre Teilhard de Chardin (1881–1955) was born only seven miles from Clermont, in the Château d'Orcines; his publications were condemned by the Roman Catholic Church. Undoubtedly, and by far, the most famous native sons of the diocese of Clermont were Édouard Michelin (1859–1940) and his elder brother André Michelin (1853–1931), who perfected the pneumatic tire.

=== Religious orders ===
The Diocese of Clermont can likewise claim a number of monks whom the Church honours as saints, viz: St. Calevisus (Calais, 460–541), a pupil in the monastery of Menat near Riom, whence he retired to Maine, where he founded the Abbey of Anisole; St. Maztius (died 527), founder at Royat near Clermont of a monastery which became later a Benedictine priory; St. Portianus (sixth century), founder of a monastery to which the city of Saint-Pourçain (Allier) owes its origin; St. Étienne de Muret (1046–1124), son of the Viscount of Thiers and founder of the Order of Grandmont in Limousin, and St. Peter the Venerable (1092–1156), of the Montboissier family of Auvergne, noted as a writer and Abbot of Cluny.

In the diocese of Clermont, the king of France enjoyed the right of nomination of the head of numerous houses. These included the Benedictine abbeys of Saint-Austremoine d'Issiore, Ebrulles, La Chaise-Dieu, Saint-Allire-les-Clermont, Manlieu (Grand-lieu), Mauzac près de Riom, Menat, Saint Symphorien, Thiers, and Aurillac. Cistercian abbeys included: Bellaigue, Bouchet (Vau-Luisant), Mont-Peyroux, and Val-honneste. The king nominated the Abbot of the Augustinian house at Chantoin, as well as the Premonstratensian Abbots of Saint-André-lez-Clermont, Saint-Gilbert-de-Neuf-fontaines, and the abbeys of Beaumont, La Boissie, Cessac, and L'Eschelle. Priories which were royal benefices were: Bragat, Cusset, Theulle (Ordre de Grammont), and Sallignac. He also held the nomination of the Collegiate Churches of Arthonne (the Abbot), Verneul (the Dean, Chanter, and five prebends), and the Dean of Saint-Amable de Rion. Other abbeys in the diocese included Saint-Pourçain, between Clermont and Moulins.

The mendicant orders began to appear in the diocese of Clermont at an early date. The Franciscans were installed in Montferrand around 1224, and shortly thereafter at Le Puy. The Dominicans were in evidence in Clermont itself by 1227 and the Franciscans in 1241. The Dominicans also settled in Aurillac ca 1230, at Riom (1233) and at Brioude (ca. 1240–1244). Clermont also had houses of Clarisses and Carmelites. The Augustinians settled at Ennezat in 1352 and the Carmelites at Aurillac in 1358. The Dominicans opened a convent at Saint-Flour before 1367. The Celestines took up residence in Vichy in 1410. The reformed Franciscans appeared in the fifteenth century, and the observant Franciscans in 1430 at Murat.

The Jesuits established themselves in Clermont with the College de Clermont in 1630, after a stormy beginning in which the municipality attempted to bring the college under its control. The institution grew in numbers and prestige until 1762, when an ordinance of the Parlement of Paris of 27 February forbade the municipal officers of Clermont from choosing the masters and regents of the college from among the Jesuits. The Jesuits left Clermont in March, and the Society of Jesus was completely suppressed in France in 1764. Thereafter the college was administered by a committee, authorized by a royal order, of which the Bishop was the chair. In 1791 the college became an 'Institut' administered by the Directorate of the Département, and in 1796 it became the École centrale du département de Puy-de-Dôme and was administered by the municipal committee on public instruction. The Jesuits also had colleges at Billom and Mauriac.

Other religious orders suffered in the Revolution. All monastic vows were abolished by the Constituent Assembly in the Autumn of 1789, and on 10 October 1789 all the properties and lands of the Church were confiscated for the benefit of the people. On 13 February 1790 all religious orders in France were dissolved.

During the Second World War, Gabriel Piguet, Bishop of the Diocese at the time, was imprisoned in Dachau Concentration Camp, after being arrested by the Gestapo for allowing Jewish children to be hidden in a boarding school. During his confinement, he ordained Blessed Karl Leisner as a priest.

=== Councils and papal visits ===
Church councils took place at Clermont in 535, 549, c. 585–588, 590, 1095, 1130.

The Council of 535 met under the presidency of Bishop Honoratus of Bourges and ratified at least fifteen canons, including one (§2) that ordered that bishops be elected by the clergy and people, with the consent of the metropolitan; and one (§8) that forbade that Jews be appointed judges over Christians. Canon 6 prohibited sexual relations between a Christian and a Jew.

The Council of 590 met at the southern border of the diocese of Clermont, where it touches the dioceses of Mende and Rodez. The bishops at the meeting, including perhaps Avitus of Clermont and Innocentius of Rodez attempted to deal with the complicated business of Tetradia, the widow of one Desiderius, and her dealings with Count Eulalius.

Pope Urban II came to Clermont in mid-November 1095 to preside at the council which launched the First Crusade; Pope Paschal II visited the city in 1106; Callistus II on 19 May 1119; Innocent II from mid-November to early December 1130, where he held a synod; Pope Alexander III from 13 to 19 August 1162, and again from 25 May to 25 June 1165; and, in 1166, Thomas Becket. It was also at Clermont that, in 1262, in presence of St. Louis, the marriage of Philip the Bold and Isabella of Aragon was solemnized.

=== Cathedral ===
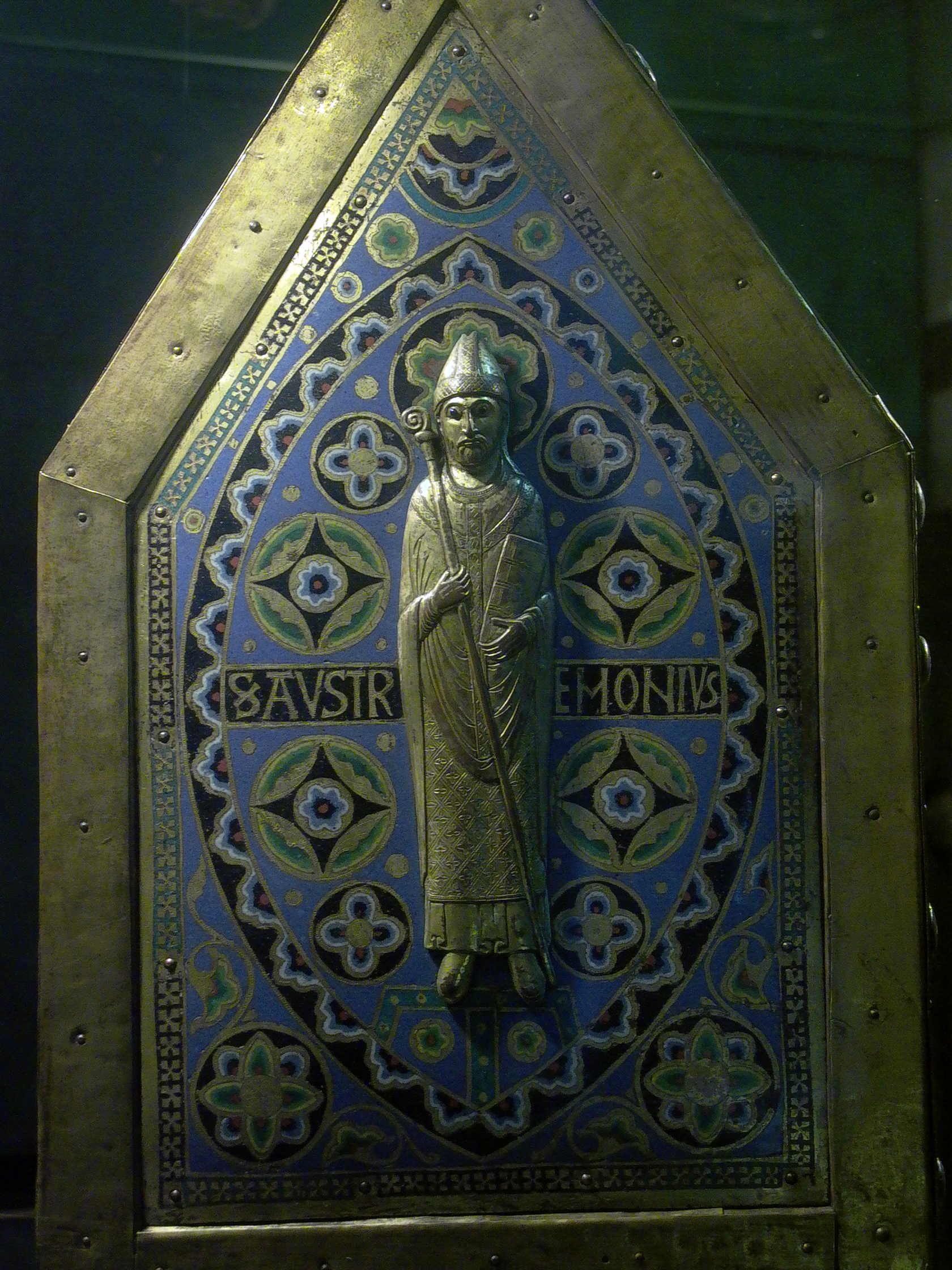
Saint Austremonius

The earliest cathedral in Clermont is naturally attributed to Saint Austremonius, the first bishop, and would therefore be a work of the third century; this is hardly likely, since Christianity was still an illegal cult, nor is it likely that it was dedicated to the Virgin Mary, given that the second cathedral had a different dedication. The second building is attributed to Bishop Namatius, in the mid-fifth century, and took twelve years to construct. It was dedicated to SS. Vitalis and Agricola. This building is described by Gregory of Tours in glowing terms. The first stone for the third cathedral was laid in 937, and it was dedicated by Bishop Stephanus (II) nine years later. It was dedicated to the Virgin, SS. Vitalis and Agricola, S. Croix, S. Gervais, S. John the Baptist, S. Julian the Martyr, and the Holy Angel. The fourth and current cathedral was founded in 1248 by Bishop Hugues de la Tour, who laid the first stone before his departure for Crusade. The cathedral was finally consecrated in 1341, though it was still uncompleted.

The Cathedral Chapter of Clermont had three dignities (the Provost, the Abbot, and the Dean); there were thirty-five Canons, all of which were filled by vote of the Chapter. The Chapter was suppressed by the Constitutional government in 1793. It was reestablished in accordance with the Concordat of 1801 by Bishop Du Valk de Dampierre in April 1803, with only one dignity, the Grand Chantre, and ten canons.

The Grand Seminaire de Clermont was the idea of Bishop Louis d'Estaing (1650–1664), whose principal concern was the improvement of the condition of the clergy of his diocese. In 1653 the bishop entered into an agreement with the Abbey of Saint-Alyre for the conversion of an unused priory in Clermont for his seminary, in exchange for a tax abatement. The project won the approval of the government of Louis XIV in a royal edict of 1654. In 1775 the Grand Seminary was transferred to larger quarters, and its quarters handed over to the Petit Seminaire which had been founded in 1712. Both were closed by order of the Revolutionary government and the buildings were sold on 11 February 1791 and turned into a barracks. The Grand Seminary was reconstituted by Bishop Du Valk de Dampierre in 1804 at Montferrand, along with the Minor Seminary. In 1980 the Grand Seminaire de Clermont was forced to close its doors, due to the small number of ordinands. Students for the priesthood from the diocese now attend the Séminaire Saint-Irénée de Francheville, near Lyon.

== List of incumbents ==
=== Bishops of Clermont ===
==== Before AD 1000 ====
- Saint Austremoine
- Urbicus (died ca. 312 ?)
- Legonius
- Illidius († ca. 384)
- Nepotianus (died 22 October 388)
- Artemius
- Venerandus
- Rusticus
- Namatius (ca. 446–ca. 462)
- Eparchius (died ca. 471)
- Sidonius Apollinaris (471–486)
- Abrunculus
- Euphrasius (died ca. 515)
- Apollinaris
- Saint Quintian (Quintianus, Quintian) (c. 523)
- Gallus (ca. 525–551)
- Cautinus (c. 554–571)
- Avitus I. (571–594)
- Caesarius (attested 627)
- Saint Gallus II. (c. 650)
- Genesius (attested b656)
- Gyroindus (attested 660)
- Felix
- Garivaldus
- Praejectus (Saint Priest, Prix) († 676)
- Avitus II (676–689)
- Bonitus
- Nordbertus
- Proculus
- Thaidon
- Stephanus I (761)
- [Daibenne]
- Adebertus (785)
- Bernouin (c. 811)
- Stabilis (823?–860?)
- Sigo (c. 863)
- Egilmar (c. 878)
- Adalard (910)
- Arnold (ca. 912)
- Bernhard
- Stephan II. (962–...)
- Begon (ca. 980–ca. 1010)

==== 1000–1300 ====
- Stephan III. (c. 1010–1014)
- Stephan IV. (1014–?)
- Rencon (1030–1053)
- Stephan V de Polignac (c. 1053–1073)
- Guillaume de Chamalières (1073–1076)
- Durand (1077–1095)
- Guillaume de Baffie (1096)
- Pierre Roux (1105–1111)
- Aimeri (1111–1150)
- Stephan VI de Mercœur (1151–1169)
- Pons (1170–1189)
- Gilbert (1190–1195)
- Robert d'Auvergne (1195–1227)
- Hughes de la Tour (1227–1249)
- Guy de la Tour (1250–1286)
- Aimar de Cros (1286–1297)
- Jean Aicelin (1298–1301)

==== 1300–1500 ====
- Pierre de Cros (1302–1304)
- Aubert Aicelin de Montaigu (1307–1328)
- Arnaud Roger de Comminges (1328–1336)
- Raymond D'Aspet (1336–1340)
- Étienne Aubert (1340–1352), later Pope Innocent VI.
- Pierre André (1342–1349)
- Pierre D'Aigrefeuille(1349–1357)
- Jean de Mello (1357–1376)
- Henri de La Tour (1376–1415)
- Martin Gouge de Charpaignes (1415–1444)
- Jacques de Comborn (1445–1474)
- Antoine Allemand (1475–1476)
- Charles I de Bourbon (1476–1488) (also Bishop of Lyon)
- Charles II de Bourbon (1489–1504)

==== 1500–1800 ====
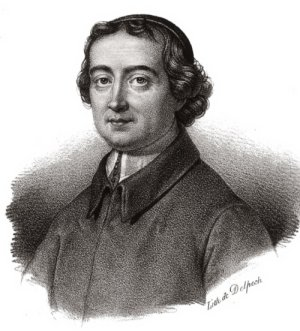
Jean-Baptiste Massillon

- Jacques d'Amboise (1505–1516)
- Thomas Duprat (1517–1528)
- Guillaume Duprat (1529–1560)
- Bernardo Salviati (1561–1567)
- Antoine de Saint-Nectaire (1567–1584)
- François de La Rochefoucauld (1585–1609) (also Bishop of Senlis)
- Antoine Rose (1610–1614)
- Joachim d'Estaing (1615–1650)
- Louis d'Estaing (1650–1664)
- Gilbert de Veiny d'Arbouze, O.S.B.Clun. (1664–1682)
- François Bochart de Saron (1687–1715)
- Louis de Balzac d'Illiers d'Entragues (1716–1717)
- Jean-Baptiste Massillon (1717–1742)
- François-Marie Le Maistre de La Garlaye (1743–1775)
- François de Bonnal (1776–1800)
  - Jean-François Périer, Orat. (1791–1793; 1796–1802) (Constitutional Bishop of Puy-de-Dôme)

==== 1800–2002 ====
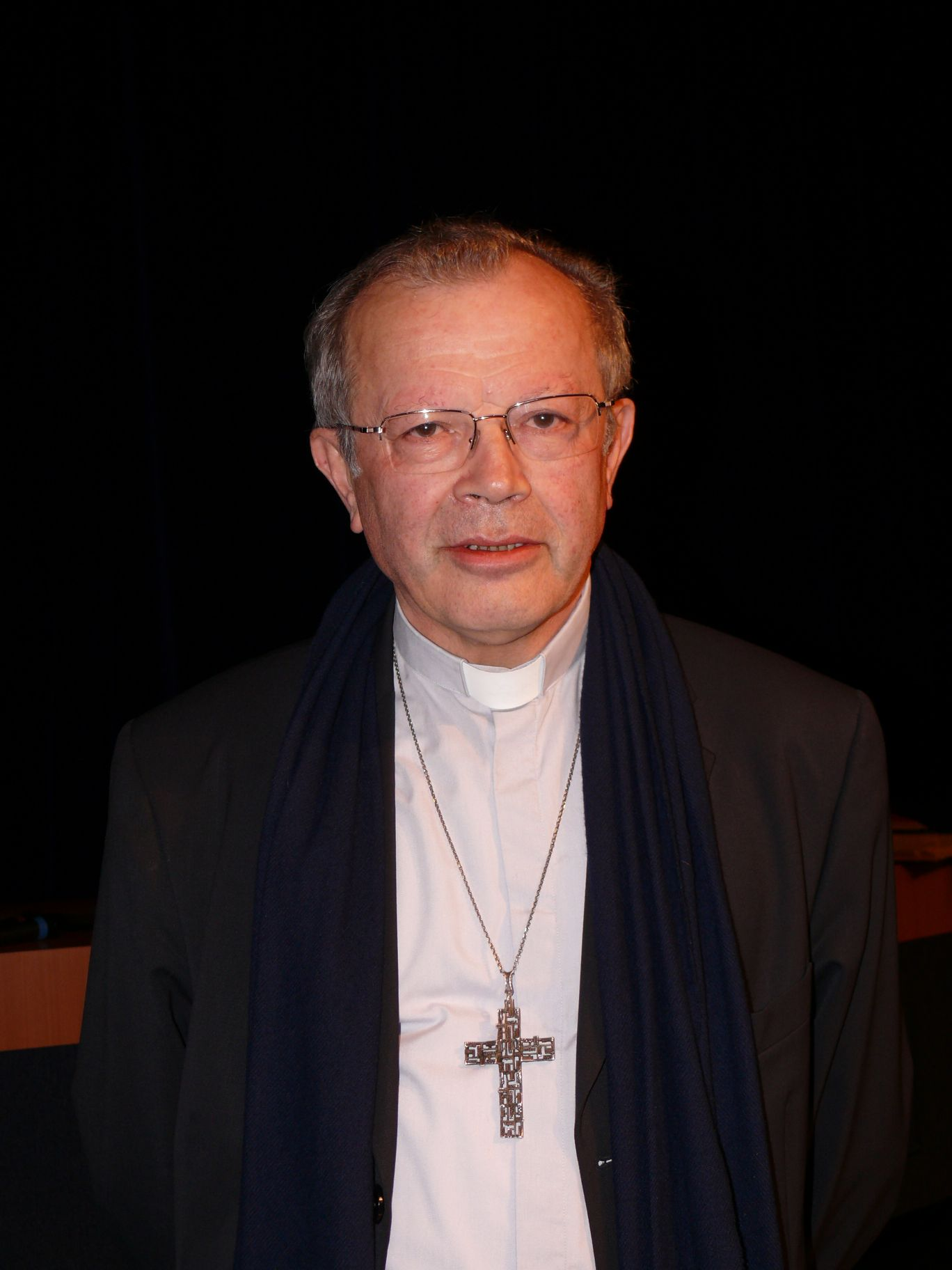
Archbishop Hippolyte Louis Jean Simon

- Charles-Antoine-Henri Du Valk de Dampierre (1802–1833)
- Louis-Charles Féron (1833–1879)
- Jean-Pierre Boyer (1879–1892)
- Pierre-Marie Belmont (1893–1921)
- Jean-François-Etienne Marnas (1921–1932)
- Gabriel Piguet (1933–1952)
- Pierre-Abel-Louis Chappot de la Chanonie (1953–1974)
- Jean Louis Joseph Dardel (1974–1995)
- Hippolyte Louis Jean Simon (1996–2002)

=== Archbishop of Clermont ===
- Hippolyte Louis Jean Simon (2002–2016)
- François Kalist (2016–present)

== See also ==
- Catholic Church in France

== Bibliography ==
=== Reference books ===
- Eubel, Conradus, ed. (1913). Hierarchia catholica, Tomus 1 (second ed.). Münster: Libreria Regensbergiana. p. 192. (in Latin)
- Eubel, Conradus, ed. (1914). Hierarchia catholica, Tomus 2 (second ed.). Münster: Libreria Regensbergiana. p. 130.
- Gulik, Guilelmus (1923). Eubel, Conradus (ed.). Hierarchia catholica, Tomus 3 (second ed.). Münster: Libreria Regensbergiana. pp. 169–170.
- Gauchat, Patritius (Patrice) (1935). Hierarchia catholica IV (1592-1667). Münster: Libraria Regensbergiana. p. 153.
- Ritzler, Remigius; Sefrin, Pirminus (1952). Hierarchia catholica medii et recentis aevi V (1667-1730). Patavii: Messagero di S. Antonio. p. 161.
- Ritzler, Remigius; Sefrin, Pirminus (1958). Hierarchia catholica medii et recentis aevi VI (1730-1799). Patavii: Messagero di S. Antonio. p. 169.
- Ritzler, Remigius; Sefrin, Pirminus (1968). Hierarchia Catholica medii et recentioris aevi sive summorum pontificum, S. R. E. cardinalium, ecclesiarum antistitum series... A pontificatu Pii PP. VII (1800) usque ad pontificatum Gregorii PP. XVI (1846) (in Latin). Vol. VII. Monasterii: Libr. Regensburgiana.
- Remigius Ritzler; Pirminus Sefrin (1978). Hierarchia catholica Medii et recentioris aevi... A Pontificatu PII PP. IX (1846) usque ad Pontificatum Leonis PP. XIII (1903) (in Latin). Vol. VIII. Il Messaggero di S. Antonio.
- Pięta, Zenon (2002). Hierarchia catholica medii et recentioris aevi... A pontificatu Pii PP. X (1903) usque ad pontificatum Benedictii PP. XV (1922) (in Latin). Vol. IX. Padua: Messagero di San Antonio. ISBN 978-88-250-1000-8.
- Sainte-Marthe, Denis de (1720). Gallia Christiana: In Provincias Ecclesiasticas Distributa... Provinciae Burdigalensis, Bituricensis (in Latin). Vol. Tomus secundus. Paris: Typographia Regia. pp. 222–420.

=== Studies ===
- Gonod, B. Chronologie des évêques de Clermont et des principaux événémens de l'histoire ecclésiastique de l'Auvergne (in French). Clermont-Ferrand: Thibaud-Landriot. 1833.
- Gonod, Benoît (1839). Notice historique de la cathédrale de Clermont-Ferrand (in French). Clermont-Ferrand: imprimerie de Thibaud-Landriot, libraire.
- Jean, Armand (1891). Les évêques et les archevêques de France depuis 1682 jusqu'à 1801. Paris: A. Picard. pp. 105–110.
- Martin, Daniel, ed. (2002). L'identité de l'Auvergne: mythe ou réalité historique : essai sur une histoire de l'Auvergne des origines à nos jours (in French). Nonette: Editions Créer. ISBN 978-2-909797-70-0.
- Société bibliographique (France) (1907). L'épiscopat français depuis le Concordat jusqu'à la Séparation (1802-1905). Paris: Librairie des Saints-Pères.
- Tardieu, Ambroise (1870). Histoire de la ville de Clermont-Ferrand (in French). Vol. Premier volume. Moulins: Editions de la Tour Gile. ISBN 9782878021431.
