= Hippolyte Simon =

French Roman Catholic archbishop (1944–2020)

Monsignor Hippolyte Simon
- Archbishop of Clermont
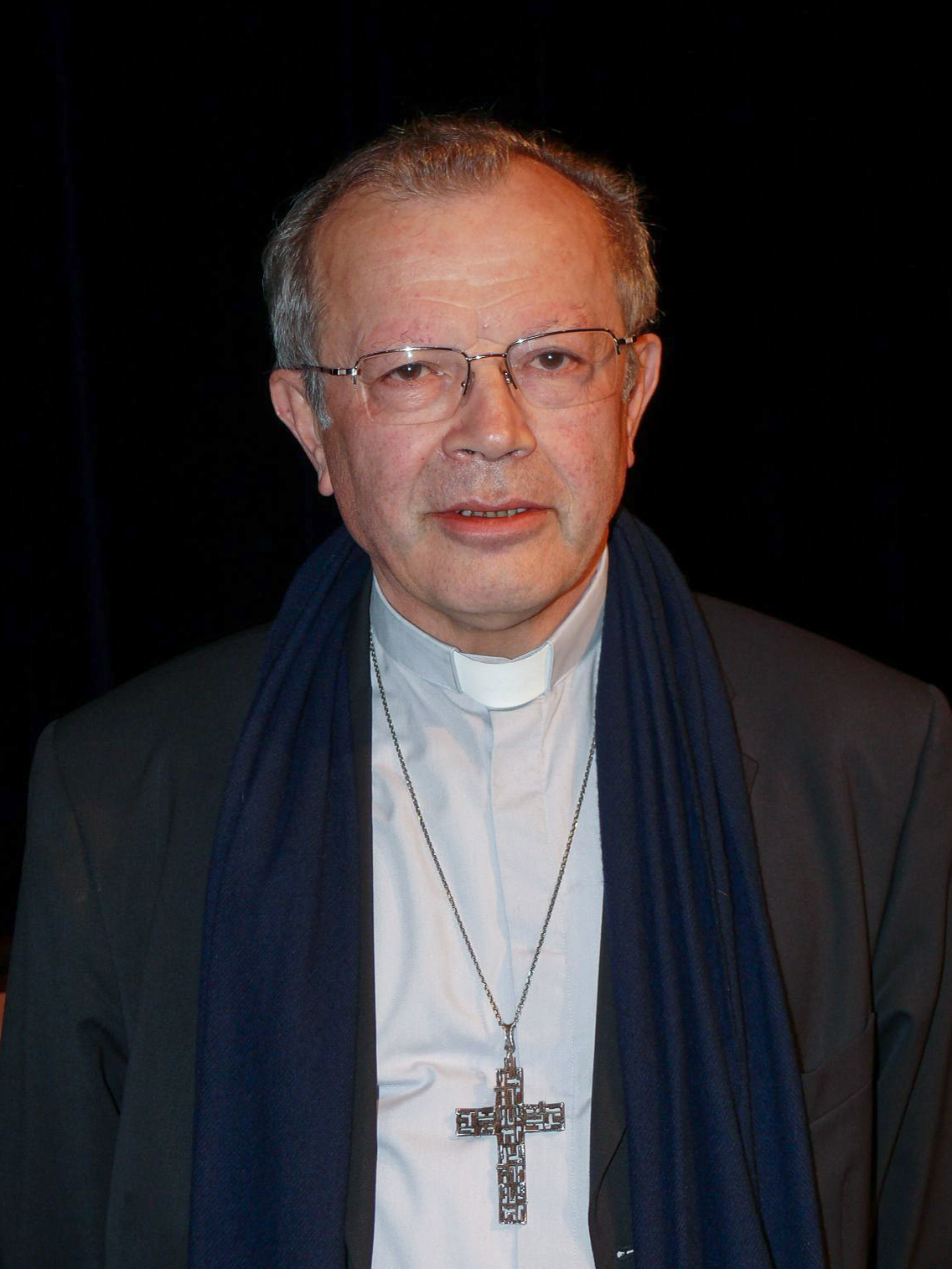
- Monsignor Simon in 2009
- Installed: 16 December 2002
- Term ended: 17 March 2016
- Predecessor: position established
- Successor: François Kalist

Orders
- Ordination: 27 June 1970

Personal details
- Born: Hippolyte Louis Jean Simon; 25 February 1944 Saint-Georges-de-Rouelley, France
- Died: 25 August 2020 (aged 76) Caen, France
- Denomination: Roman Catholic
- Coat of arms

Hippolyte Simon (25 February 1944 – 25 August 2020) was a French Roman Catholic archbishop. He served as Bishop of Clermont from 1996 to 2002 before becoming Archbishop, serving until 2016. He was Vice-President of the Bishops' Conference of France from 2007 to 2013.

== Biography ==
After entering the Seminary of Coutances, Simon pursued a degree from the Seminary of Bayeux. He subsequently earned a master's degree in philosophy from the Institut Catholique de Paris and another master's in political philosophy from the University of Paris 1 Pantheon-Sorbonne. Here, he defended his thesis, titled Le dépérissement de l’État selon Karl Marx.

Simon was ordained on 27 June 1970 in the Diocese of Coutances. His first vocation was a lycée chaplain in Mortain, then staying in Caen from 1978 to 1990. He was a diaconate in the Diocese of Coutances from 1990 to 1996, and was one of the auditors at the Institut des hautes études de défense nationale from 1993 to 1994. He was appointed as Bishop of Clermont on 22 February 1996 and took office on 4 May, succeeding Jacques Fihey and residing at the Clermont-Ferrand Cathedral. His position was elevated to archbishop status on 16 December 2002 following a redistribution of ecclesiastical provinces in France by Pope John Paul II. Therefore, he became Archbishop of Clermont.

Simon represented France in the Commission of the Bishops' Conferences of the European Community until November 2007, when he was succeeded by Christian Katz of Strasbourg. Monsignor Simon submitted his resignation letter on 22 February 2016 to Pope Francis, and the resignation took effect on 17 March.

Hippolyte Simon died on 25 August 2020 in Caen at the age of 76.

== Books ==
- Marx, l'État et la Liberté (1977)
- Chrétiens dans l'État moderne (1984)
- Église et Politique (1990)
- Les Vocations (1992)
- Vers une France païenne ? (1999)
- Libres d’être prêtres (2001)
- La Liberté ou les Idoles ? (2002)
- Les catholiques et l'Europe (2006)
- Vous qui cherchez Dieu, voici un GPS (2010)
