= Sauvadet =

Sauvadet is a surname. Notable people with the surname include:

- Florent Sauvadet (born 1989), French footballer
- François Sauvadet (born 1953), French journalist and politician
