= Notre Dame Basilica =

Notre Dame Basilica may refer to:

- Basilica of Notre-Dame de Boulogne, Boulogne-sur-Mer, France
- Basilica of Notre-Dame du Port, Clermont-Ferrond, France
- Notre-Dame de Nice, Nice, France
- Notre-Dame Basilica (Montreal), Montreal, Quebec, Canada
- Basilica of the Sacred Heart, Notre Dame, Notre Dame, Indiana, United States
- Notre-Dame Cathedral Basilica, Ottawa, Ontario, Canada
- Notre-Dame-du-Cap Basilica, Trois-Rivières, Quebec, Canada
- Saigon Notre-Dame Basilica, Saigon, Vietnam

== See also ==
- Notre Dame (disambiguation)
