= Henri de La Tour =

- Bishop of Clermont
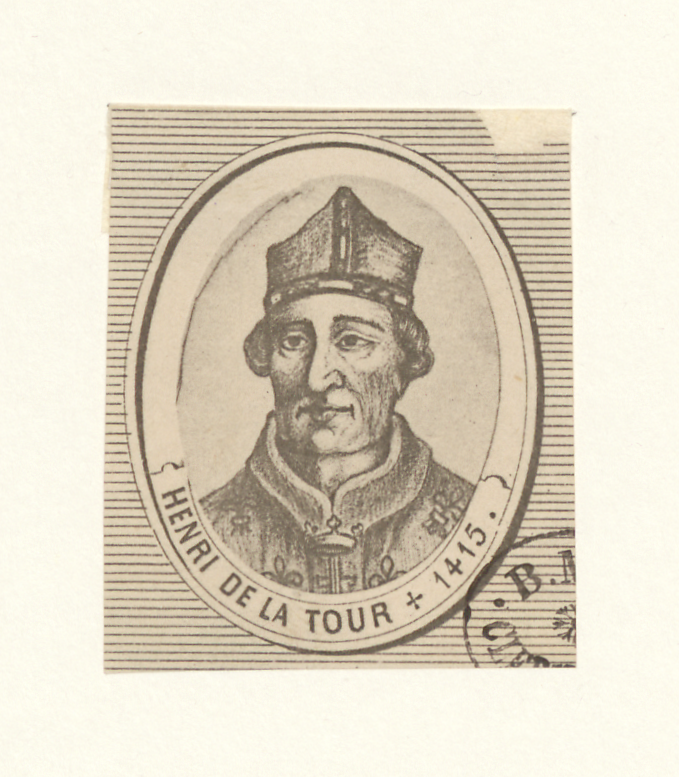
- In office: 2 of January 1376 - 7 of May 1415
- Predecessor: Jean de Mello
- Successor: Martin Gouge
- Other posts: Canon of Clermont; Archdeacon of Paris

Personal details
- Died: 7 of may 1415
- Parents: Bertrand III, lord of La Tour; Isabelle de Lévis

Henri de La Tour (died 1415) was a clergyman and Bishop of Clermont from 1376 until his death.

== Life ==
He was the son of Bertrand III, lord of La Tour, and Isabelle de Lévis.

He was elected Canon of Clermont and then Archdeacon of Paris in 1375. He was then elected bishop of Clermont on the 2nd of January 1376.

In 1392 Charles VI of France sent aid to rebuild Clermont from the devastation of the Hundred Years' War.

He died the 7 of May 1415.

Catholic Church titles
| Preceded by Jean de Mello | Bishop of Clermont; 1376 - 1415 | Succeeded by Martin Gouge |
