= François Kalist =

French Catholic bishop

- Archbishop of Clermont
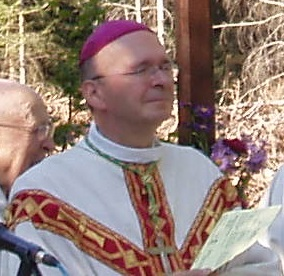
- Kalist in 2011
- Church: Catholic Church
- Archdiocese: Clermont
- Appointed: 20 September 2016
- Installed: 27 November 2016
- Predecessor: Hippolyte Simon
- Previous post: Bishop of Limoges (2009–2016)

Orders
- Ordination: 21 December 1986 by Pierre Plateau
- Consecration: 17 May 2009 by Albert Rouet

Personal details
- Born: François Michel Pierre Kalist; 30 October 1958 (age 68) Bourges, Cher, France

Ordination history
History
Diaconal ordination
- Ordained by: Pierre Plateau
Priestly ordination
- Ordained by: Pierre Plateau
Episcopal consecration
- Principal consecrator: Albert Rouet
- Co-consecrators: Armand Maillard, Christophe Dufour
Episcopal succession
Bishops consecrated by François Kalist as principal consecrator
- Marc Michel Beaumont: 16 May 2021
- Didier Noblot: 12 September 2021
- Yves Baumgarten: 27 March 2022

François Michel Pierre Kalist (born 30 October 1958) is a French Roman Catholic prelate who has served as the archbishop of the Archdiocese of Clermont since 2016.
