= François de Bonal =

- Bishop of Clermont
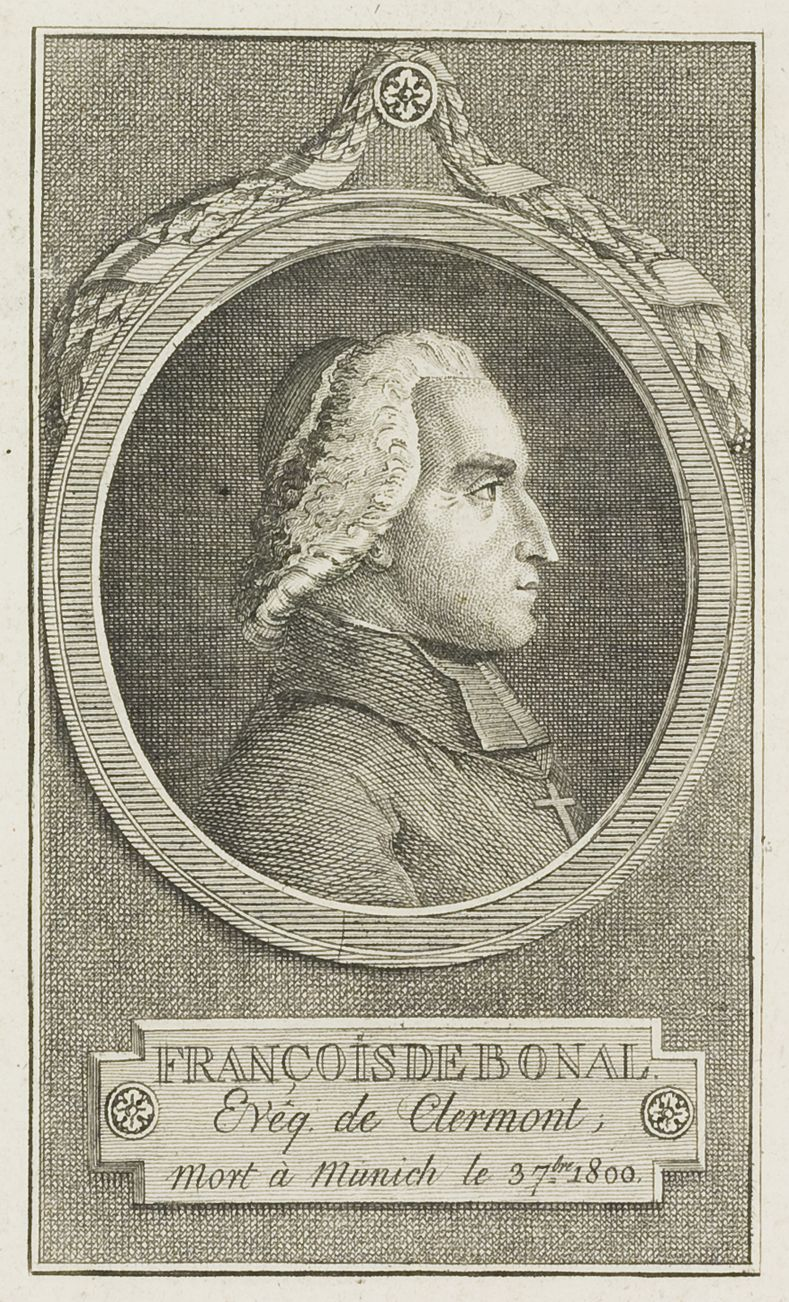
- Church: Catholic Church
- Diocese: Diocese of Clermont
- In office: 16 September 1776 – 5 September 1800
- Predecessor: François-Marie Le Maistre de La Garlaye
- Successor: Charles-Antoine-Henri Du Valk de Dampierre

Orders
- Consecration: 6 October 1776 by Giuseppe Doria Pamphili

Personal details
- Born: 9 May 1734 Penne-d'Agenais, Guyenne, Kingdom of France
- Died: 5 September 1800 (aged 66) Munich, Electorate of Bavaria, Bavarian Circle, Holy Roman Empire

François de Bonal (b. 9 May 1734 at the castle of Bonal, near Agen; d. in Munich, 5 September 1800) was a Catholic Bishop and figure in the French Revolution.

== Life ==
Bonal became a canon at Chalons-upon-the-Saone, then Vicar-General of the diocese of Agen and Director of the Carmelite nuns in France, before being made Bishop of Clermont in 1776. In the 1780s, he passed an unpopular decree prohibiting the priests of his diocese from preaching without his authorization.

On the eve of the French Revolution, as Bonal was warning his diocesans against the license of the press, showing the evil consequences to France. In his pastoral letters, he denounced "the mortal poison of an impious philosophy which is spreading among us."

He went as an episcopal delegate to the Estates-General of 1789 by the clergy of the bailiwick of Clermont, and subsequently to the National Assembly, where he led the religious coalition, arguing that "the principles of the French Constitution depend on religion as their eternal basis," and that Christianity was aligned with, not opposed to, good citizenship. In 1790, he led most of the episcopal delegates in refusing to vote on the Civil Constitution of the Clergy, claiming that a lay assembly did not have the authority to make the ecclesiastical reforms involved. In addition to opposing various measures to reduce the power of the Catholic Church, Bonal also opposed granting citizenship to French Jews.

To Target, who spoke of the "God of peace," he replied that the God of peace was also the God of order and justice.

From his prison Louis XVI sent for his opinion as to whether he should receive Paschal Communion. In reply, he was sympathetic, but advised the monarch to abstain "for having sanctioned decrees destructive of religion". Bonal was alluding chiefly to the civil constitution of the clergy.

Having declined to take the loyalty oath to the constitution, Bonal was exiled from France in 1792. He passed to Flanders and later to Holland. Arrested at Texel by the French, he was tried at Breda, and condemned to deportation. He succeeded in making his escape and went to Altona, and spent the last years of his life in various cities of Germany. He was the author of a Testament spirituel.

== Sources ==
- François-Xavier de Feller, Biographie universelle (Paris, 1866)
- De GreveCoeur, Journal d'Andrien Duquesnoy (Paris, 1804)
