= Hugh of La Tour-du-Pin =

Bishop of Clermont

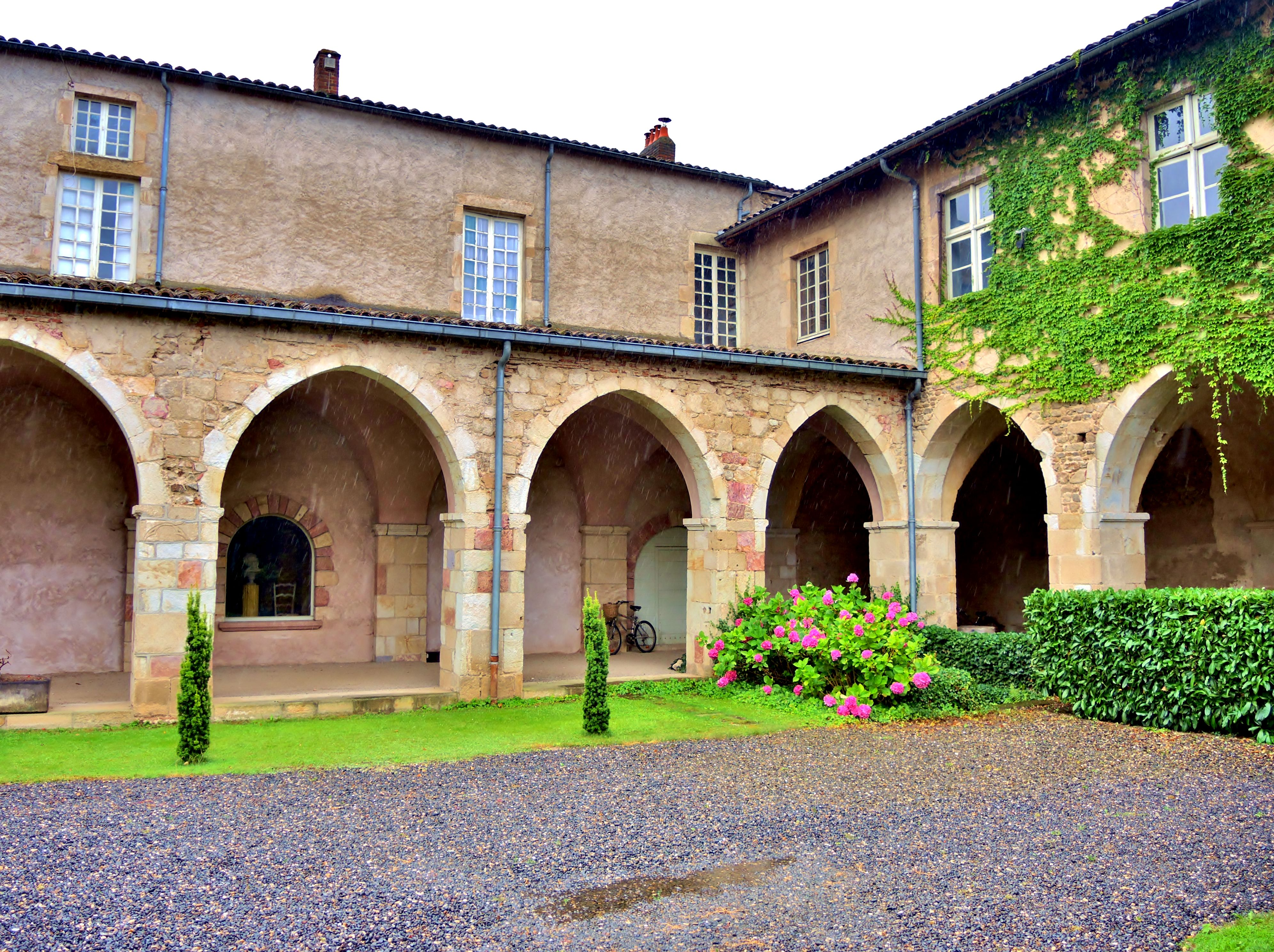
Ruins of Sauxillanges today, where Hugh was prior

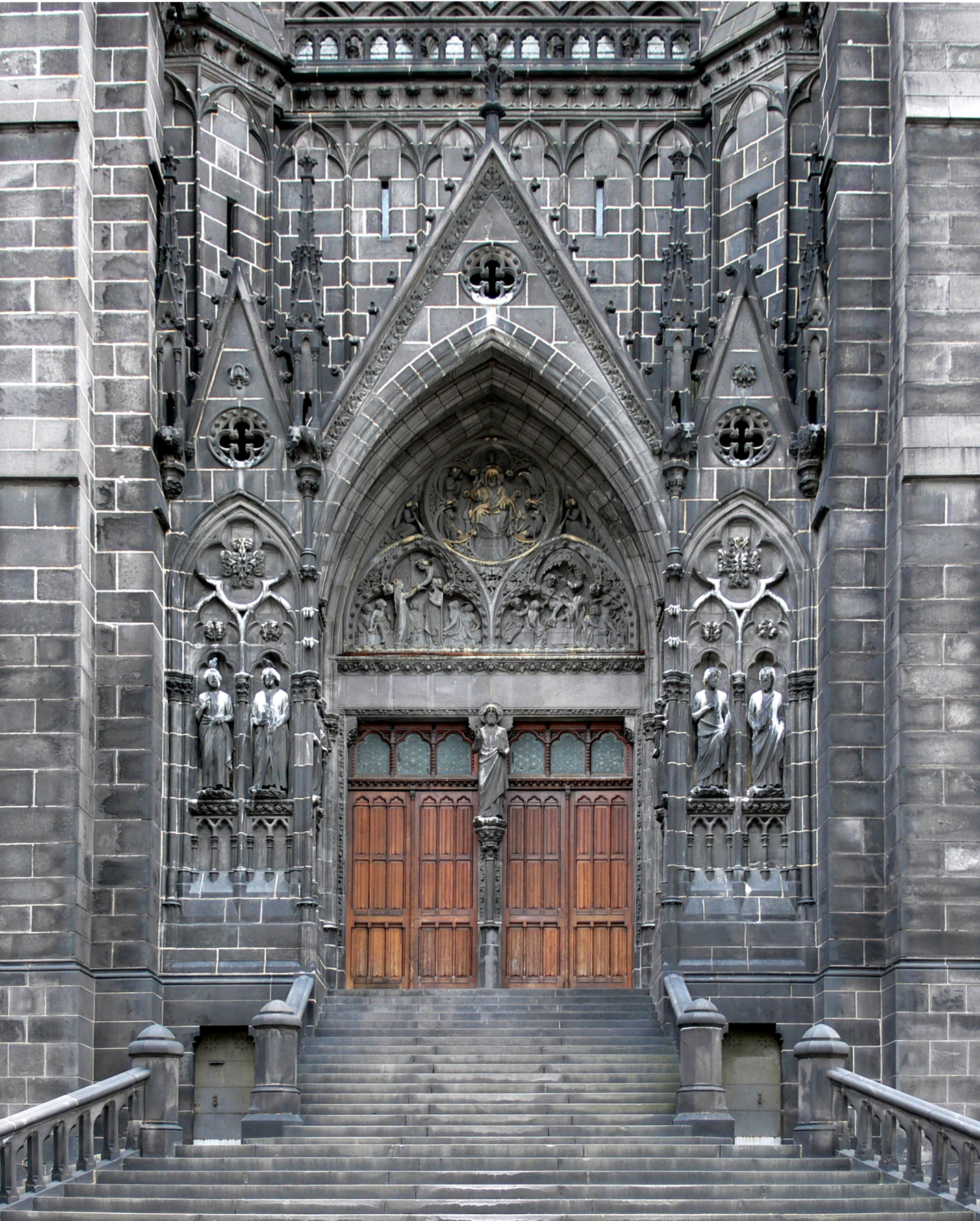
Main entrance of the Gothic cathedral of Clermont, begun by Hugh

Hugh of La Tour-du-Pin (1197/1198 – December 1249) was the bishop of Clermont from 1227 until his death.

Hugh was a son of Albert, lord of La Tour-du-Pin, and Marie d'Auvergne. He is called magister, showing that he had a formal education. Before his election as bishop, he was the prior of the Cluniac abbey of Sauxillanges, where many members of his family had served as prior. By 1227, he was also the provost of Clermont and a subdeacon. That year, he was elected to succeed his uncle, Robert of Auvergne, as bishop of Clermont after the latter was transferred to the archdiocese of Lyon. Since Hugh was only twenty-nine years old at the time, Pope Gregory IX appointed him diocesan administrator on 30 April 1227. He was confirmed as bishop after he turned thirty.

In 1229, Hugh, with Bishop Milo of Beauvais, brought French troops to Italy at the request of Gregory IX to fight against Frederick II, Holy Roman Emperor, in the War of the Keys. In 1242, during the Saintonge War, King Louis IX sent Hugh, joined by Humbert of Beaujeu, to harass the possessions of the rebellious Count Raymond VII of Toulouse in the Quercy. Raymond surrendered the castles of Saverdun and Bram to Hugh and Humbert.

In 1243, Pope Innocent IV suspended Hugh and placed him under interdict for failing to attend a synod of the ecclesiastical province of Bourges, whose authority Hugh refused to recognize. In 1245, Hugh attended the ecumenical council of Lyon.

In 1246, Hugh completed construction on a Dominican convent in Clermont, although it burned down in 1398. That year, Innocent IV granted him an indulgence for his contribution to the construction of a Franciscan convent in Brioude. On 26 April 1248, Hugh attended the dedication of Louis IX's Sainte-Chapelle in Paris. He is usually thought to have initiated the construction of the current Gothic cathedral of Clermont after seeing Sainte-Chapelle, but there is evidence that preparation for a new cathedral was underway as early as 1244. The design of the new cathedral was the work of the architect Jean des Champs.

Hugh joined the Seventh Crusade under Louis IX, embarking at Aigues-Mortes on 26 August 1248. Before leaving, he ceded part of the episcopal palace complex to the cathedral chapter for the new construction. He died in Egypt in December 1249. He was succeeded as bishop by his nephew, Guy.

== Bibliography ==
- Claverie, Pierre-Vincent (2014). "Stephen de Mezel Bishop of Famagusta and His Age (1244–1259)". In Michael J. K. Walsh; Tamás Kiss; Nicholas S. H. Coureas (eds.). The Harbour of all this Sea and Realm: Crusader to Venetian Famagusta. Central European University Press. pp. 41–52.
- Davis, Michael T. (1981). "The Choir of the Cathedral of Clermont-Ferrand: The Beginning of Construction and the Work of Jean Deschamps". Journal of the Society of Architectural Historians. 40 (3): 181–202. doi:10.2307/989693. JSTOR 989693.
- Eubel, Conradus, ed. (1913). Hierarchia catholica medii aevi. Vol. 1 (2nd ed.). Libreria Regensbergiana.
- Griffiths, Quentin (1964). The Counselors of Louis IX (PhD dissertation). University of California, Berkeley.
- Jordan, William (1979). Louis IX and the Challenge of the Crusade: A Study in Rulership. Princeton University Press.
- Labouderie, Jean [in French] (1833). Chronologie des évêques de Clermont et des principaux événémens de l'histoire ecclésiastique de l'Auvergne. Clermont-Ferrand: Thibaud-Landriot.
- Prou, Maurice (1890). "Review of Les Registres de Grégoire IX". Revue critique d'histoire et de littérature. New series. 30 (2): 149–153.
- Strayer, Joseph R. (1969). "The Political Crusades of the Thirteenth Century". In R. L. Wolff; H. W. Hazard (eds.). A History of the Crusades, Volume II: The Later Crusades, 1189–1311. University of Wisconsin Press. pp. 343–375.

Preceded by Robert of Auvergne	Bishop of Clermont; 1227–1249	Succeeded by Guy of La Tour-du-Pin
