= Florent Sauvadet =

French footballer (born 1989)

Personal information
- Date of birth: 31 January 1989 (age 37)
- Place of birth: Issoire, France
- Height: 1.77 m (5 ft 10 in)
- Position: Forward

Team information
- Current team: Fleury 91

Youth career
- 2006–2007: AS Montferrand
- 2007–2010: Clermont Foot B

Senior career*
Years	Team	Apps	(Gls)
2010–2012	Clermont Foot	32	(1)
2013	Petrolul Ploieşti	8	(3)
2014	Universitatea Cluj	7	(0)
2015–2017	AS Yzeure	48	(9)
2017–2019	Annecy	6	(1)
2019–	Fleury 91	5	(1)
- * Club domestic league appearances and goals as of 01:35, 3 November 2019 (UTC)

Florent Sauvadet (born 31 January 1989) is a French footballer who plays as forward for FC Fleury 91.

== Honours ==
Petrolul Ploieşti

- Romanian Cup (1): 2012–13
