= Cassius of Clermont =

3rd-century Christian martyr

Saint Cassius of Clermont and Companions
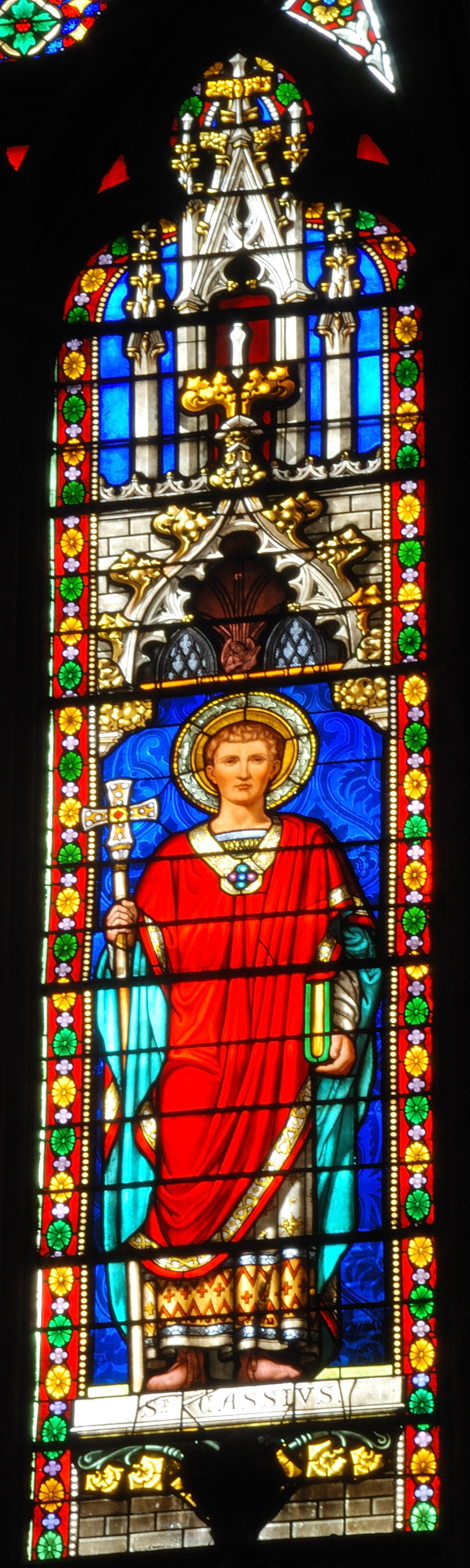
- Stained glass depiction of Cassius, Église Saint-Eutrope, Clermont-Ferrand

Martyr
- Died: ~264 AD; Clermont-Ferrand, France
- Venerated in: Roman Catholic Church; Eastern Orthodox Church
- Feast: May 15

Saint Cassius of Clermont is venerated as a Christian martyr of the 3rd century. He was a senator who was converted to Christianity by Austromoine.

Cassius was killed with Victorinus (a pagan priest who had also been converted by Austremonius), Maximus, Anatolius, Linguinus, and others at Clermont-Ferrand by Chrocas, the chieftain of the Alemanni, who were invading Roman Gaul at the time. Chrocas is said to have killed a total of 6,266 Christians at Clermont at this time, according to tradition.

Gregory of Tours mentions a Church of Saint Cassius the Martyr at Clermont.
