= Avitus (spider) =

Scientific classification
- Kingdom: Animalia
- Phylum: Arthropoda
- Subphylum: Chelicerata
- Class: Arachnida
- Order: Araneae
- Infraorder: Araneomorphae
- Family: Salticidae
- Subfamily: Salticinae
- Genus: Avitus; Peckham & Peckham, 1896

Type species
- A. diolenii Peckham & Peckham, 1896

Species
- 6, see text

Genus of spiders

Avitus is a genus of jumping spiders that was first described by George and Elizabeth Peckham in 1896.

== Species ==
As of June 2019 it contains six species, found in Brazil, Panama, Argentina, and on the Greater Antilles:

- Avitus anumbi Mello-Leitão, 1940 – Brazil
- Avitus castaneonotatus Mello-Leitão, 1939 – Argentina
- Avitus diolenii Peckham & Peckham, 1896 (type) – Panama
- Avitus longidens Simon, 1901 – Argentina
- Avitus taylori (Peckham & Peckham, 1901) – Jamaica
- Avitus variabilis Mello-Leitão, 1945 – Argentina
