= Austromoine =

3rd-century founding Bishop of Clermont

Saint Austremonius
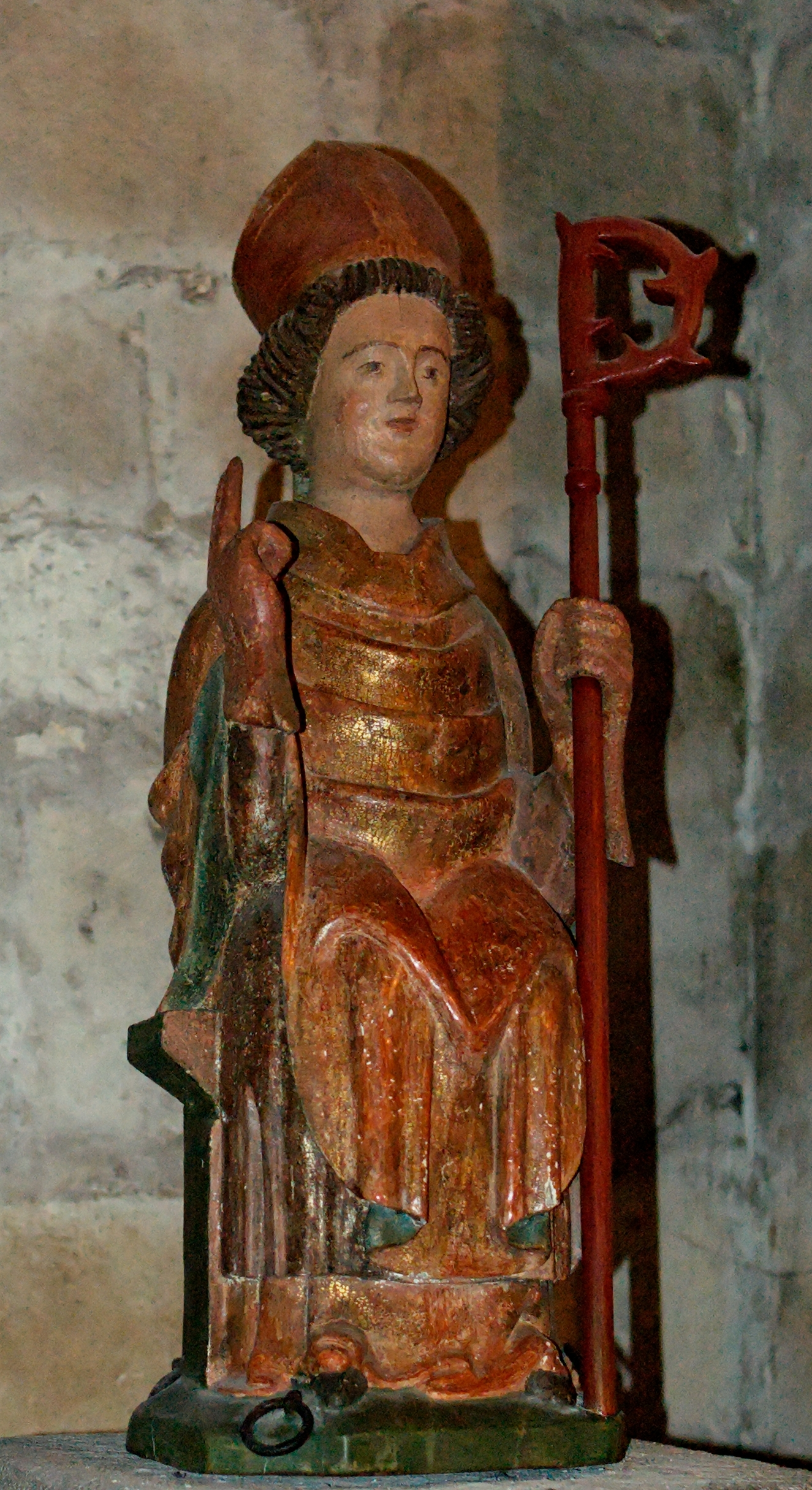
- Wood statue of St. Austremonius, 17th century, church of Saint-Austremoine in Issoire; Auvergne, France

Bishop and Apostle of Auvergne
- Born: 3rd century
- Died: 3rd century
- Venerated in: Catholic Church
- Major shrine: St.-Yvoine, near Issoire
- Feast: November 1

Stremonius or Saint Austremonius or Saint Stramonius or Austromoine, the "apostle of Auvergne," was the first Bishop of Clermont. He is venerated as a saint in the Catholic Church.

== Legend ==
During the consulship (in 250 AD) of the Emperor Decius and Vettius Gratus, according to Gregory of Tours, who calls him Stremonius, Pope Fabian sent out seven bishops from Rome to Gaul to preach the Gospel: Gatien to Tours, Trophimus to Arles, Paul to Narbonne, Saturninus to Toulouse, Denis to Paris, Martial to Limoges, and Austromoine to Clermont.

At Clermont he is said to have converted the senator Cassius of Clermont and the pagan priest Victorinus, to have sent St. Serenus to Thiers, St. Marius to Salers, and Antoninus into other parts of Auvergne, and to have been beheaded.

A tradition states that Saint Austremonius ordered Nectarius of Auvergne to Christianize the plain of Limagne in the Massif Central.

== Veneration ==
His veneration was highly localized, but at Clermont he was moved back in time, to the 1st century AD, along with others of the Apostles to Gaul, such as Saint Martial, to become one of the "seventy-two Disciples of Christ", and was claimed to have been a converted Jew who came with St. Peter from Palestine to Rome and subsequently became the Apostle of Auvergne, as well as of Berry and Nivernais. It is more likely that he was the contemporary of the three Bishops of Aquitaine who attended the Council of Arles in 314.

He was initially buried in a tomb at Issoire on the Couze. The local view found its origin in a life of St. Austremonius written in the 10th century in the Abbey of Mozac, where the body of the saint was transferred in 761. The Vita was rewritten and amplified by the monks of Issoire, who retained as a relic the saint's head. There is a further elaborated Vita of the late 11th century, with new episodes, made at the same time as a forgery of a charter of Pippin (the Short or one of two kings of Aquitaine being intended). The tomb was opened in 1197.

Gregory of Tours, who was born in Auvergne in 544 and was well versed in the history of that country, looks upon Austremonius as one of the seven envoys who, about 250, evangelized Gaul; he relates how the body of the saint was first interred at Issoire, being there the object of great veneration, before the body, though not the head, was translated to Clermont.

The possibility that the major dioceses of Gaul each needed an apostolic figure, and that where the historical details had lapsed (compare Gatien of Tours) one had to be supplied, to serve local pride, should not be entirely dismissed.

== Gallery ==
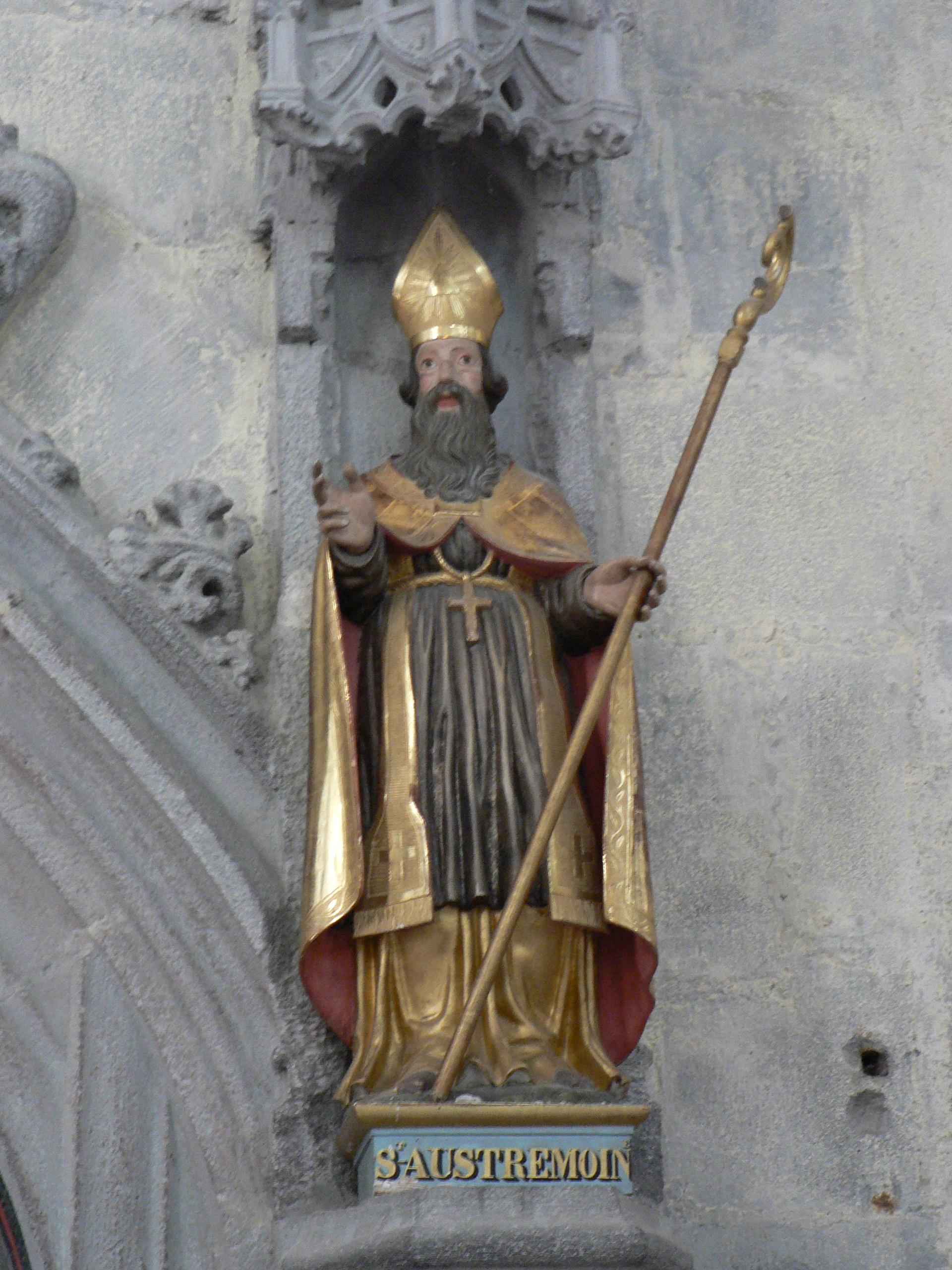

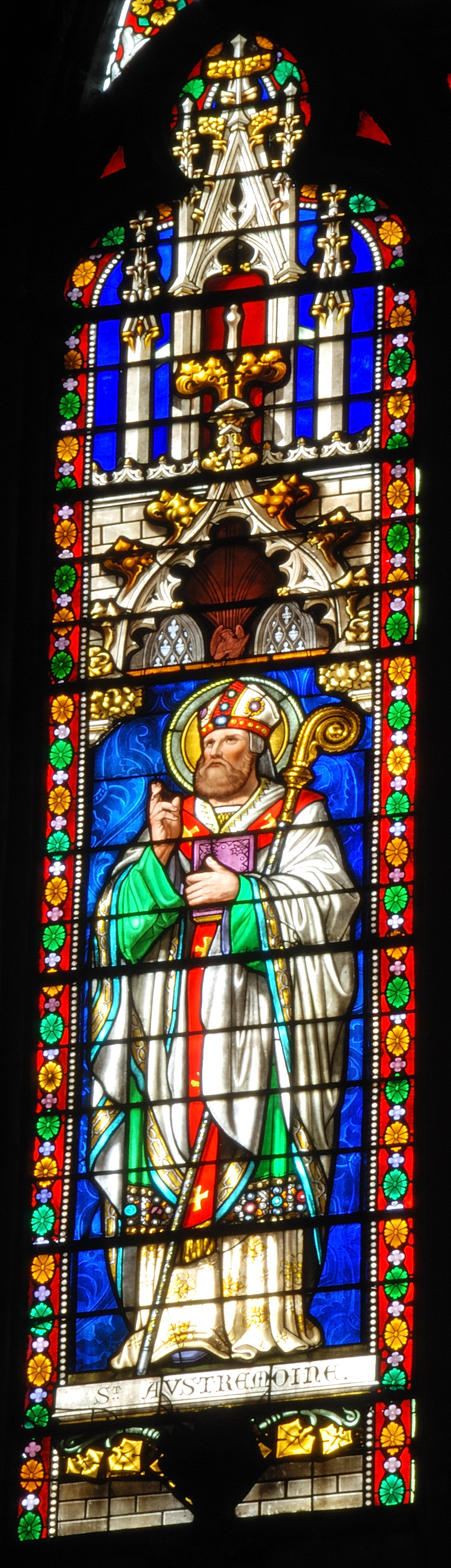

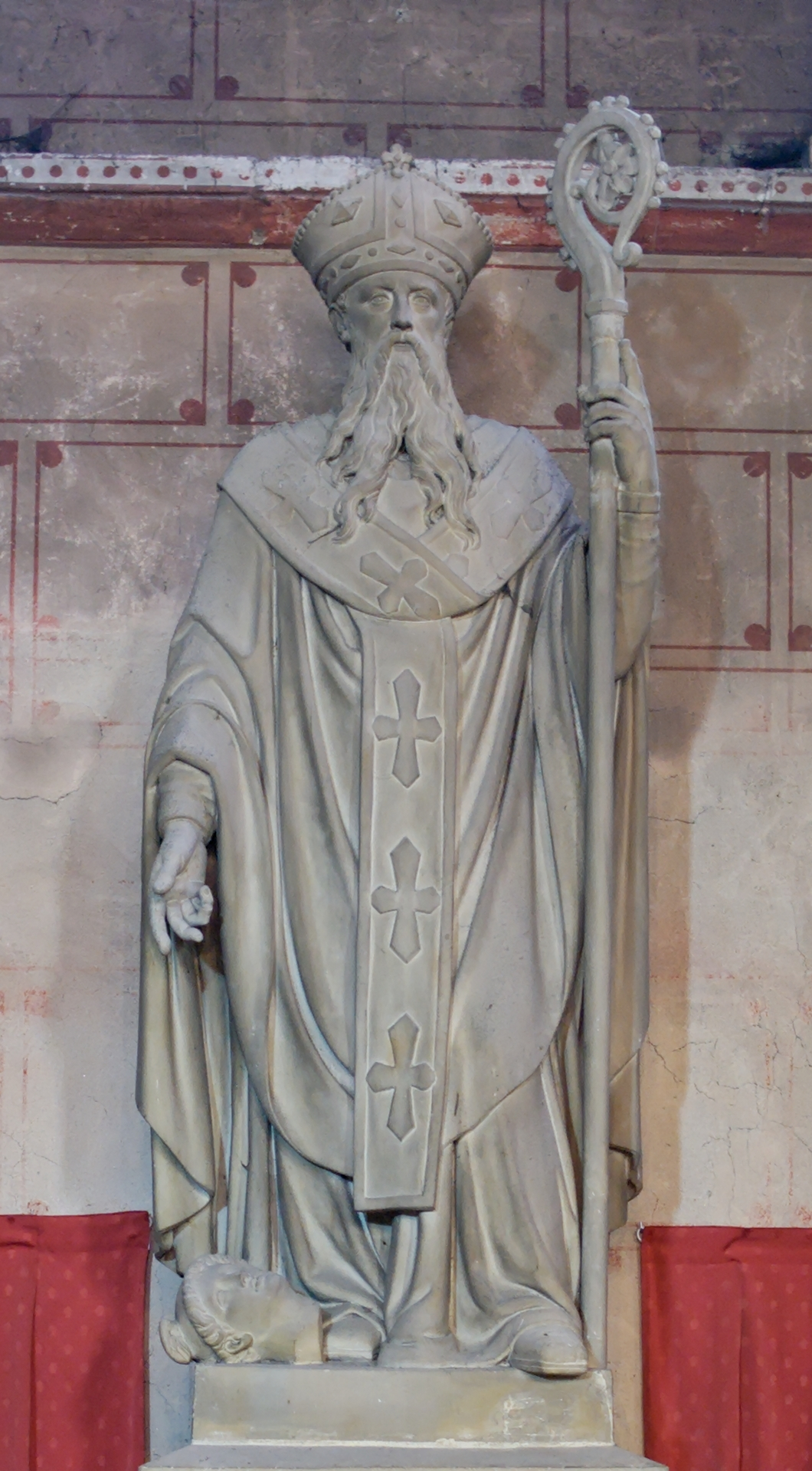

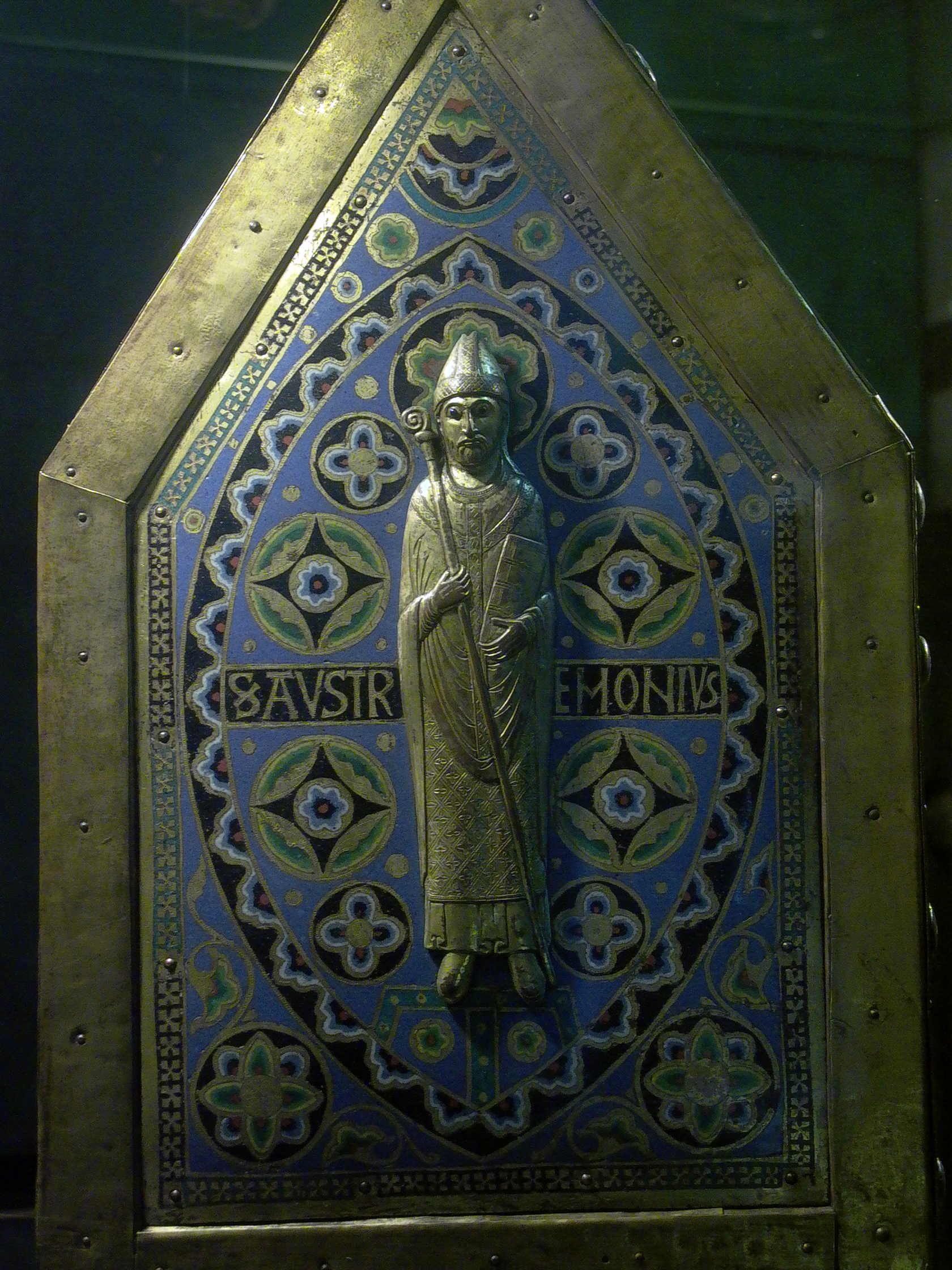

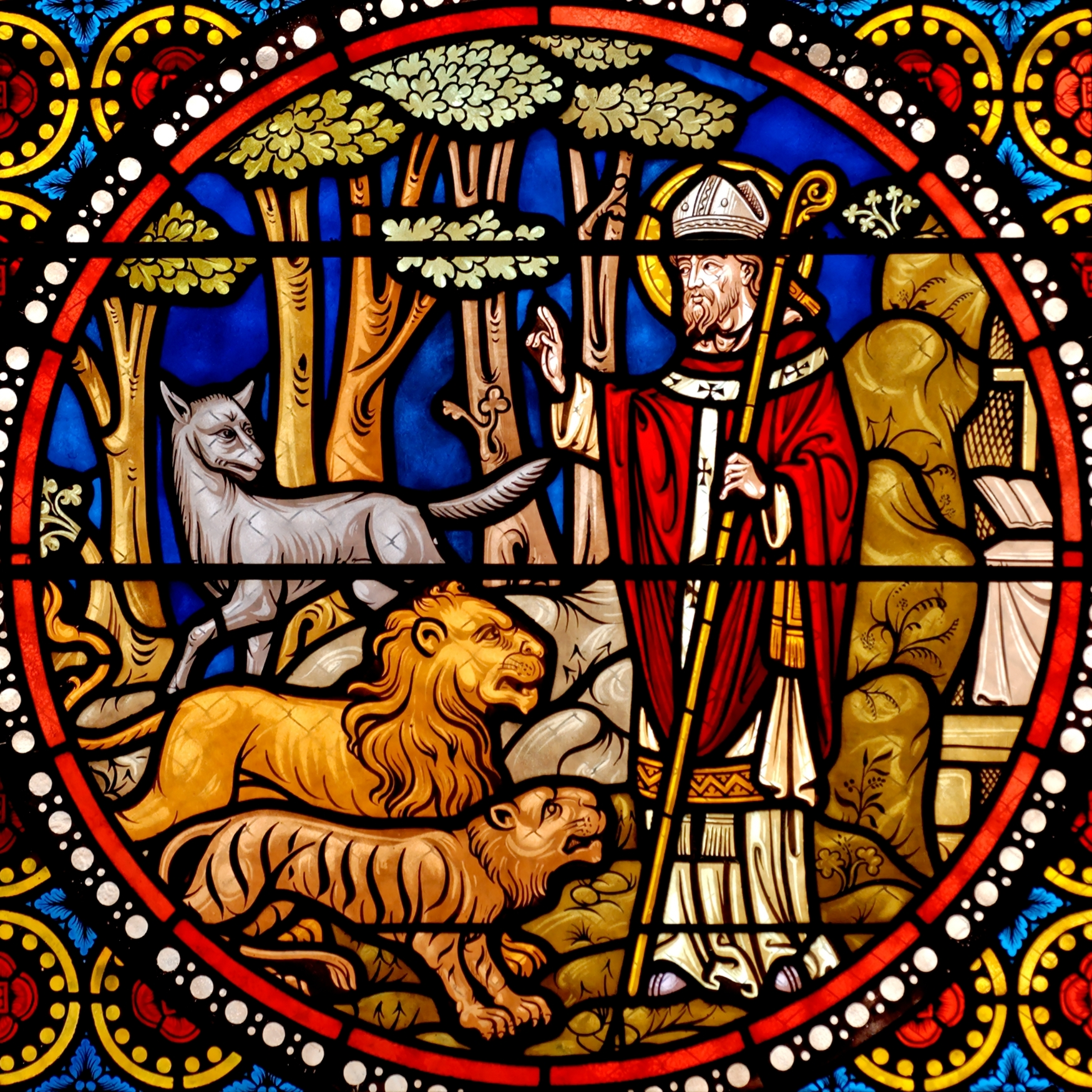

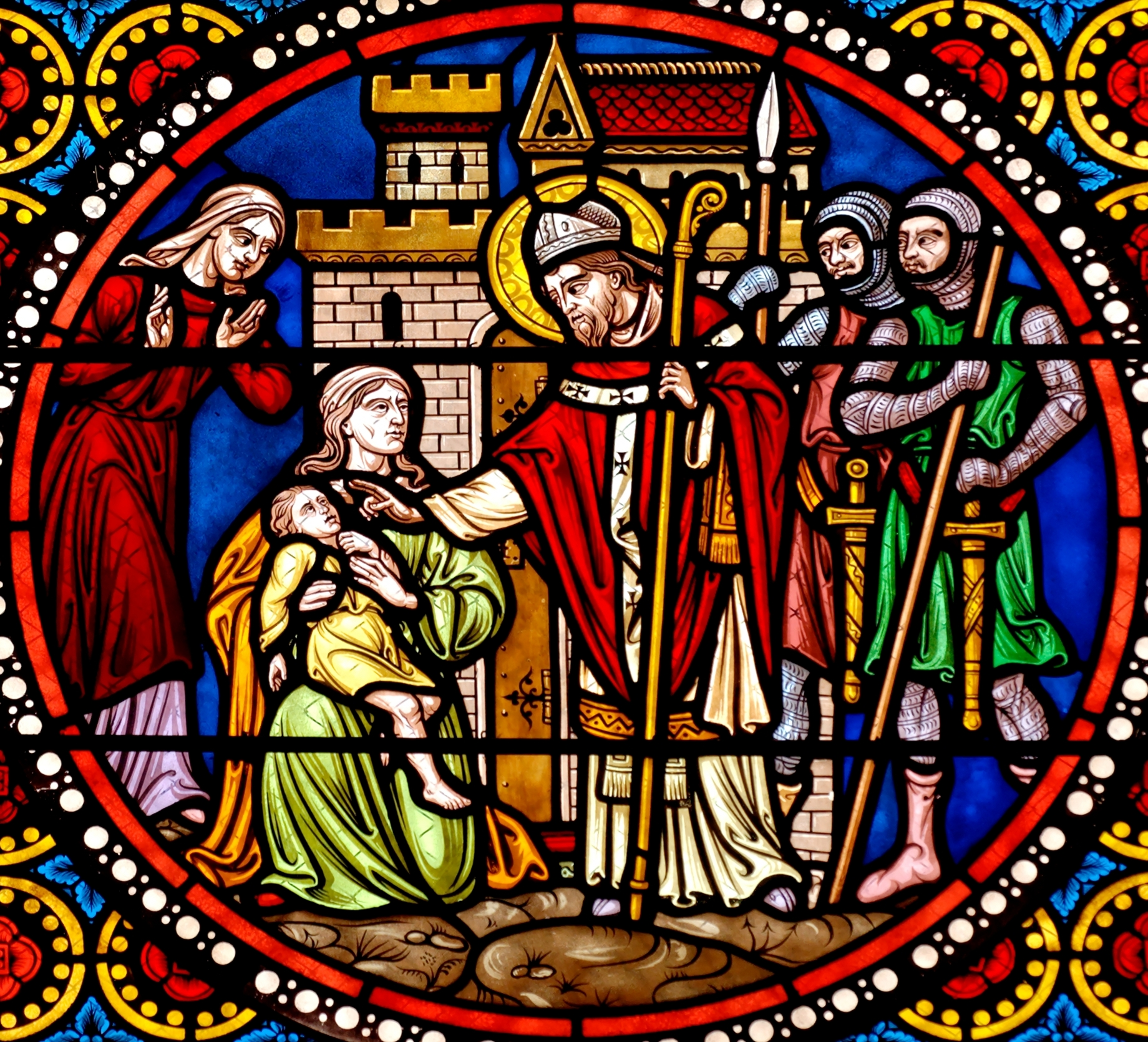

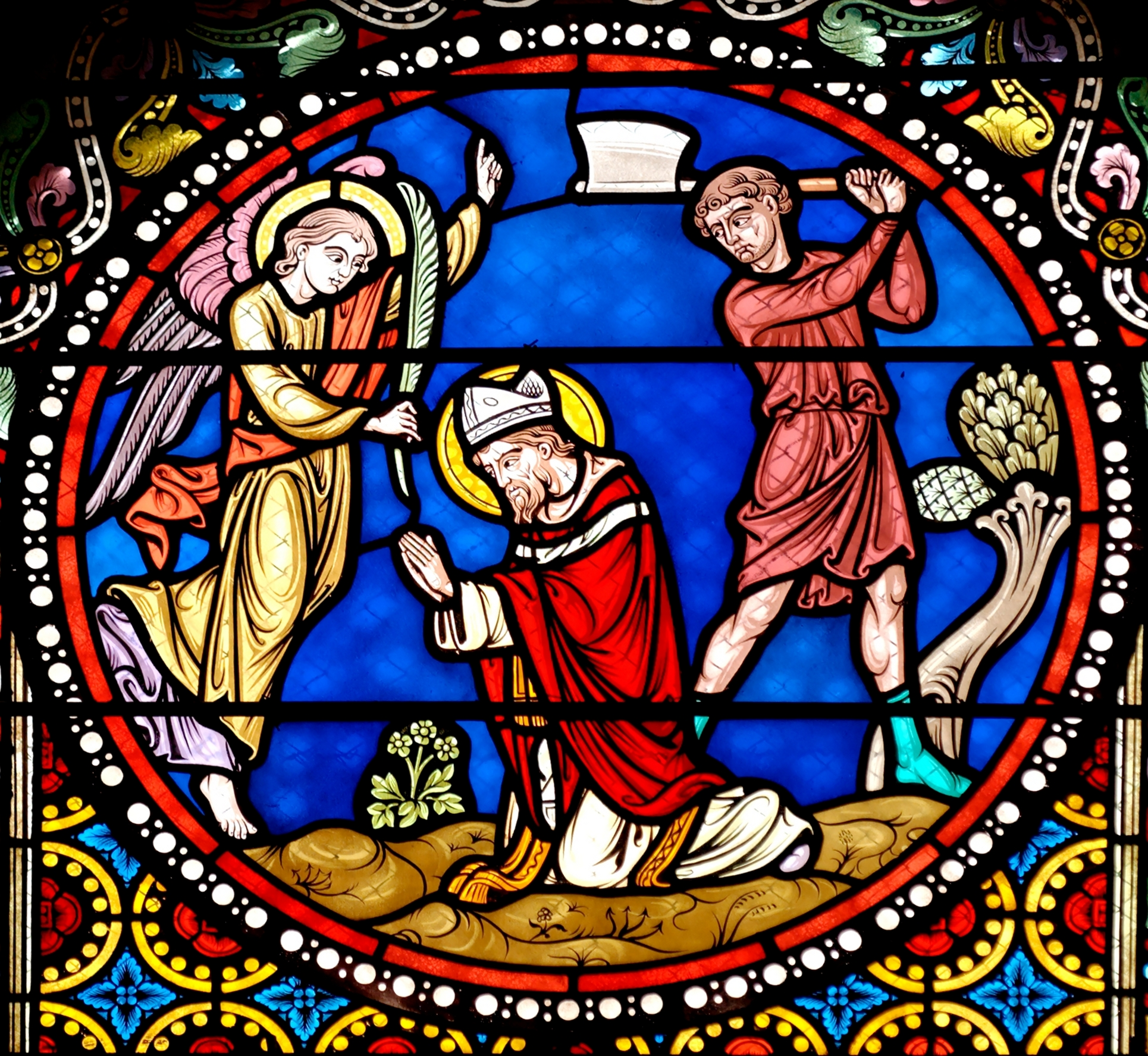
