= Avitus I of Clermont =

6th-century saint and Bishop of Clermont

Saint Avitus I of Clermont
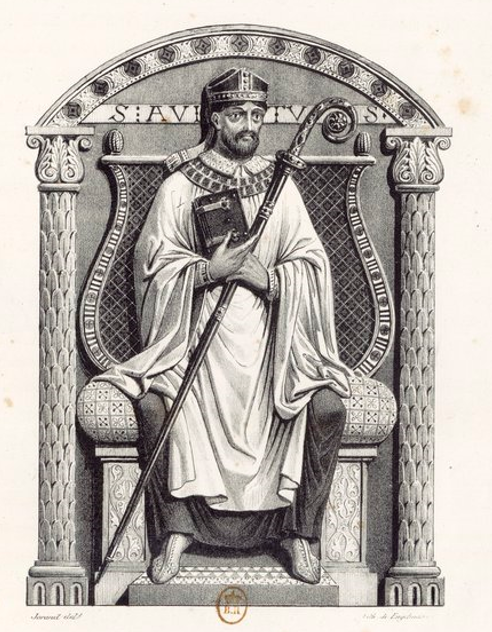

Bishop of Clermont
- Born: c. 525
- Died: c. 600 (aged c. 75)
- Venerated in: Eastern Orthodox Church; Roman Catholic Church
- Feast: 21 August

Avitus I of Clermont (French: Avit de Clermont; c. 525 – c. 600) was a Bishop of Clermont in the 6th century. He is venerated as a saint in the Eastern Orthodox Church and Roman Catholic Church. His feast day is celebrated on 21 August.

== Biography ==
He may have been born in the year 525. Avitus came from the Roman Avitii family connected with Emperor Avitus. In 571, Bishop Cautinus of Clermont died from plague. Avitus became the new bishop of Clermont. In 580, he founded the Basilica of Notre-Dame du Port in Clermont. Around 590, he may have taken part in a church council in Clermont. He died around the year 600.

== Conversion of Jews ==
In 576, an event occurred between him and the Jewish community in Clermont that was recorded by his contemporary Gregory of Tours. According to Gregory, Avitus had been praying and calling on the Jews in Clermont to convert to Christ. One of the Jews listened to the bishop and accepted baptism on Easter. This convert also joined in the Easter procession through the city. One of the other Jews then poured stinking oil on this convert's head from above while he was in the procession. The Christians wanted to stone this Jew to death, however, Avitus forbade them.

Later on the Feast of the Ascension, when Avitus was having another procession through the city, a mob of Christians attacked the Jewish synagogue in Clermont and burned it to the ground. Later, the bishop sent a messenger to the Jews in Clermont, which (according to Gregory's account) said: "I do not compel you by force to confess the Son of God, but nevertheless I preach him and I offer to your hearts the salt of wisdom. I am the shepherd put in charge of the Lord's sheep, and as regards you, the true Shepherd who suffered for us said that he had other sheep which are not in his sheepfold but which should be brought in, so that there may be one flock and one shepherd. And therefore if you are willing to believe as I, be one flock with me as your guardian; but if not, depart from the place".

Three days after this message was given, according to Gregory, 500 Jews accepted baptism rather than being forcibly expelled from the city.

== Miracle ==
According to local tradition, he once visited Menat where there were sick children. While he was there, a spring of water came out (fontaine Saint-Avit) that was able to miraculously cure the sick children.
