= Cautinus =

Cautinus (French: Cautin) was a bishop of the Diocese of Clermont in the 6th century.

== Gregory of Tours ==
Most of what is recorded about Cautinus derives from the writings of Gregory of Tours, who was a contemporary of Cautinus and a fellow bishop.

According to Gregory, following the death of the previous bishop Gall in 554, the clergy elected for a priest named Cato to become the next bishop. Cautinus, however, who was an archdeacon in Clermont, went to king Theudebald and reported the death of Bishop Gall. The king then made Cautinus as the new bishop of Clermont. Cato, however, tried to depose Cautinus afterwards and wouldn't submit to him.

He also had bad relations with Chram son of King Chlothar I of the Franks and Cato tried to get Chram to help him to get rid of Cautinus.

Cautinus was described by Gregory as being very avaricious and tried to take the property of others. Gregory recounted a story where the bishop attempted to have a priest locked in a tomb and left to die when he refused to give him the deeds to properties he owned. The priest later escaped and accused Cautinus before the king of the matter.

Gregory also claimed Cautinus was a drunkard, illiterate and 'subservient to Jews'.

Cautinus died in the year 571 on the day before Passion Sunday as a result of plague.
