= Serenus the Gardener =

Roman Greek saint (died 307)

Saint Serenus the Gardener
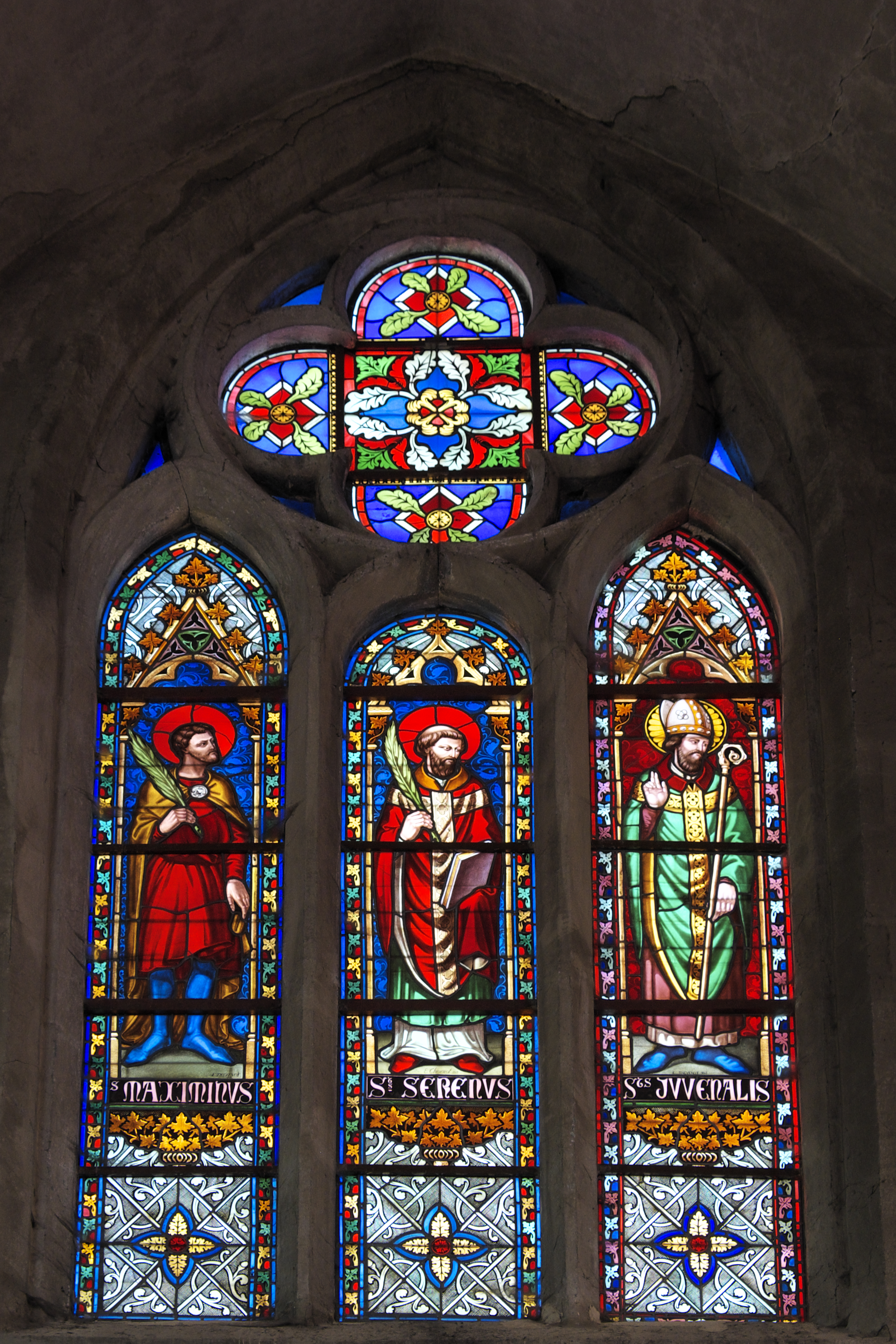
- Saint-Cerneuf (center)
- Born: Roman Greece
- Died: 23 February 307
- Venerated in: Roman Catholic Church and Eastern Orthodox Church
- Major shrine: Billom, Auvergne, France
- Feast: 23 February
- Patronage: Gardeners

Serenus the Gardener, also known as "Serenus of Billom", "Sirenatus", and, in French: Cerneuf is a 4th-century martyr who is venerated by the Roman Catholic and Eastern Orthodox Churches.

== Biography ==
According to pious legend, he was born in Greece; quit his life there and decided to live a celibate life of penance and prayer; emigrated to Sirmium, Pannonia in the Roman Empire (presently Sremska Mitrovica, Serbia); purchased, cultivated, and lived off of a garden there; and was known for his horticultural skill. He rebuked the wife of a Roman imperial guard for walking in his garden with her daughters, this purportedly being contrary to the mores of the time without male accompaniment. Her pride wounded, the wife informed her husband of the affair in writing, and he reported Serenus to Emperor Maximian, who gave the husband a letter to deliver to the governor of Pannonia that permitted the governor to remedy the supposed injustice. On the testimony of Serenus to the governor, the husband retracted his accusation and the governor judged Serenus innocent of insulting the wife. However, the governor suspected from the words of Serenus' testimony that he might be a Christian, and inquired of his religion. When Serenus testified to being one and refused to sacrifice to the Roman gods, the governor had him decapitated on 23 February 307.

Parts of this narrative are probably fictitious; however, according to Butler there may possibly be some historical basis to the story.

A tradition centered in Clermont-Ferrand, France maintains that Austremonius sent Serenus to evangelize Thiers, also in Auvergne.

== Veneration ==
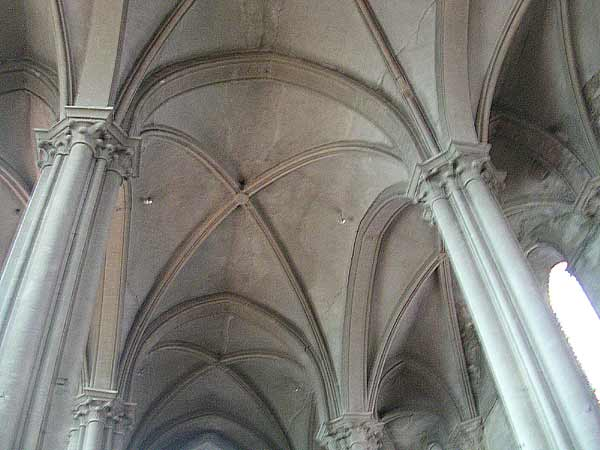
The Church of Saint-Cerneuf à Billom

The commune of Billom, Auvergne, France claimed a portion of Serenus' relics. Serenus became known as "Saint Cerneuf" in France, and "L'église Saint-Cerneuf" (the Church of Saint Serenus" in Billom is dedicated to him).

== Other gardener saints ==
- Conon the Gardener (or of Pamphylia, Palestine, or Magydos)
- Phocas the Gardener
- Fiacre
