= Avitus II of Clermont =

Bishop of Clermont and saint

Saint Avitus II of Clermont

Bishop of Clermont, Venerable
- Died: 689
- Honored in: Eastern Orthodox Church
- Feast: 21 February

Avitus II of Clermont was Bishop of Clermont from 676 to 689. He is venerated as a saint in the Eastern Orthodox Church, with a feast day on 21 February. He is described as "one of the great bishops of [his] age."
