= Avitianus =

French Roman Catholic saint

Saint Avitus of Rouen

Bishop
- Died: 325
- Venerated in: Roman Catholic Church
- Canonized: Pre-Congregation
- Major shrine: Church of Saint-Gervais
- Feast: December 2

Avitus of Rouen (died 325), also known as Avitien or Avidien, was the third Bishop of Rouen. He is venerated as a Saint in the Catholic Church.

== Biography ==
He was the third bishop of Rouen in Normandy, however his two predecessors are accepted as legendary. He is the first historically attested bishop by his presence, with Materne II, Bishop of Cologne, at the first Council of Gaul in Arles in 314. He succeeds Mellonius and settles in Rouen from 314.

The Acta archiepiscoporum Rotomagensium tell us that "This blessed pontiff was an honest spirit, impeccable in his manners, and attentive to the salvation of souls under his charge".

He is buried in the crypt of the Church of Saint-Gervais in Rouen, and his feast day is celebrated on 2 December.
