= Issoire =

- Subprefecture and commune
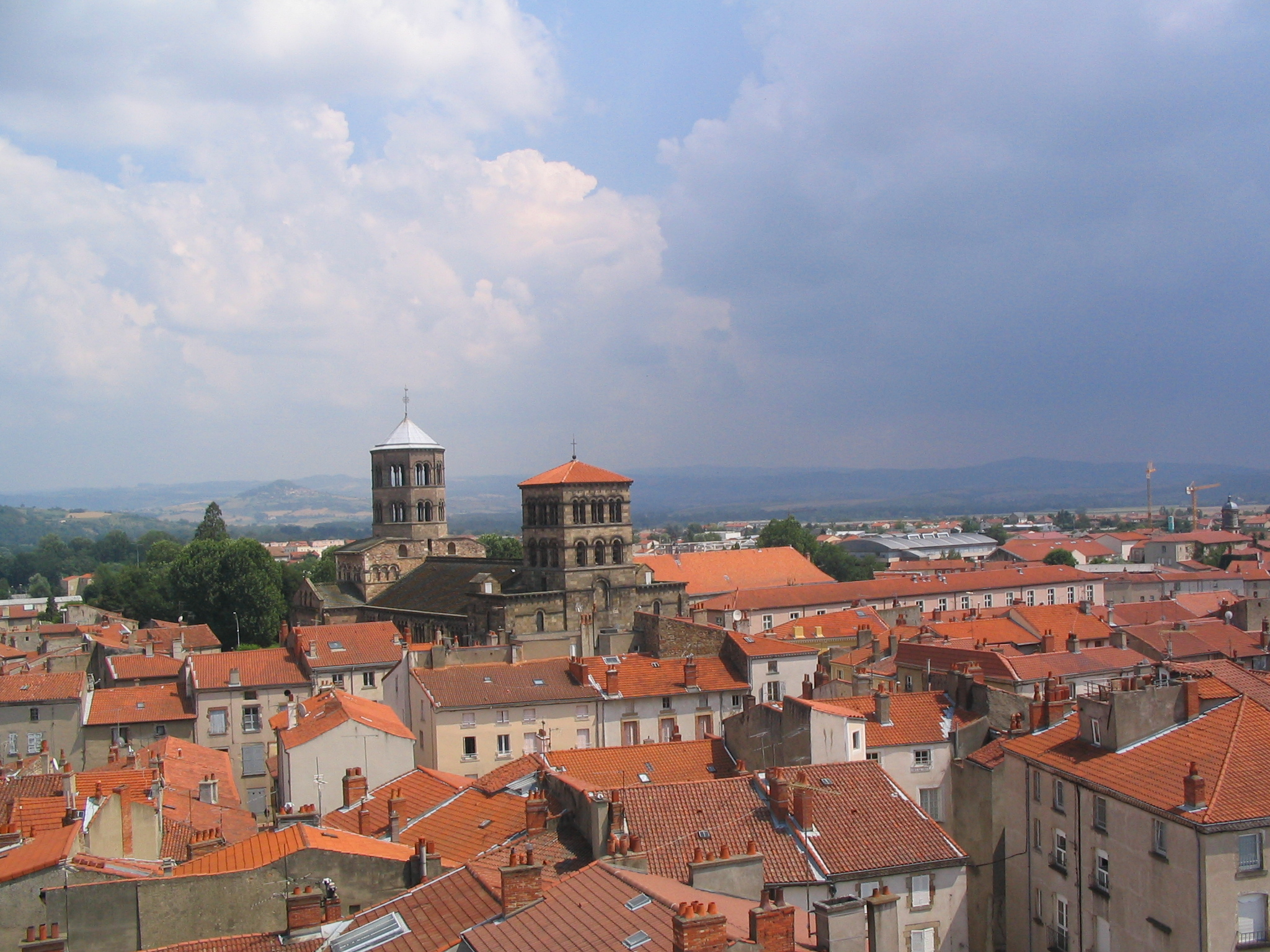
- A general view of Issoire

- Coat of arms
- Location of Issoire
- Location within France Location within Auvergne-Rhône-Alpes
- Coordinates: 45°32′42″N 3°14′59″E
- Country: France
- Region: Auvergne-Rhône-Alpes
- Department: Puy-de-Dôme
- Arrondissement: Issoire
- Canton: Issoire
- Intercommunality: Agglo Pays d'Issoire

Government
  - Mayor (2026–32): Bertrand Barraud
- Area^{1}: 19.69 km^{2} (7.60 sq mi)
- Elevation: 386 m (1,266 ft)
- Highest elevation: 560 m (1,840 ft)
- Lowest elevation: 360 m (1,180 ft)
- Population (2023): 15,115
  - Density: 767.6/km^{2} (1,988/sq mi)
- Time zone: UTC+01:00 (CET)
  - Summer (DST): UTC+02:00 (CEST)
- INSEE/Postal code: 63178 /63500
- ^{1} French Land Register data, which excludes lakes, ponds, glaciers > 1 km^{2} (0.386 sq mi or 247 acres) and river estuaries.

Issoire (French pronunciation: [iswaʁ]; Auvergnat: Issoire, Ussoire) is a commune in the Puy-de-Dôme department in Auvergne in central France.

== Geography ==
Issoire is located on the river Couze, near its confluence with the Allier, 40 km (25 mi) SSE of Clermont-Ferrand on the Paris-Lyon-Méditerranée railway to Nîmes. Issoire is situated in one of the fertile plains of the Petites Limagnes—basins that follow the Allier from its source in the Massif Central to the Grande Limagne north of Clermont-Ferrand and on to the Loire.

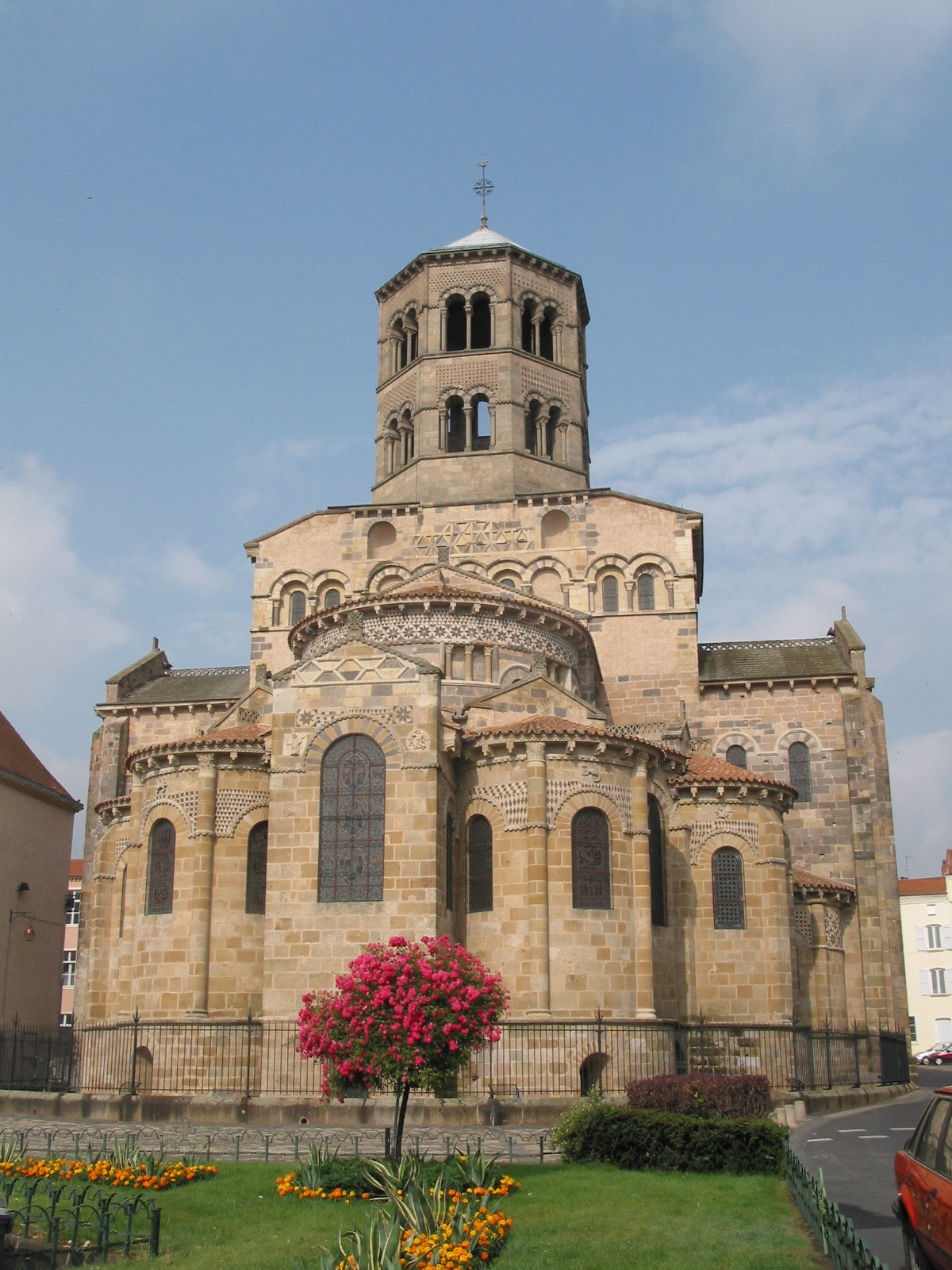
Saint-Austremoine church.

== Climate ==
On average, Issoire experiences 67.6 days per year with a minimum temperature below 0 °C (32.0 °F), 2.1 days per year with a minimum temperature below −10 °C (14.0 °F), 5.8 days per year with a maximum temperature below 0 °C (32.0 °F), and 30.3 days per year with a maximum temperature above 30 °C (86.0 °F). The record high temperature was 41.2 °C (106.2 °F) on 24 August 2023, while the record low temperature was −17.6 °C (0.3 °F) on 30 January 2005.

Climate data for Issoire, France, 1991–2020 normals, extremes 1997–present
Month	Jan	Feb	Mar	Apr	May	Jun	Jul	Aug	Sep	Oct	Nov	Dec	Year
Record high °C (°F)	21.6 (70.9)	23.5 (74.3)	26.5 (79.7)	31.0 (87.8)	33.9 (93.0)	40.3 (104.5)	40.3 (104.5)	41.2 (106.2)	38.0 (100.4)	32.4 (90.3)	25.0 (77.0)	19.1 (66.4)	41.2 (106.2)
Mean daily maximum °C (°F)	7.9 (46.2)	9.5 (49.1)	13.8 (56.8)	17.2 (63.0)	21.1 (70.0)	25.4 (77.7)	27.7 (81.9)	27.5 (81.5)	23.2 (73.8)	18.3 (64.9)	12.0 (53.6)	8.5 (47.3)	17.7 (63.9)
Daily mean °C (°F)	3.9 (39.0)	4.7 (40.5)	7.9 (46.2)	10.9 (51.6)	14.7 (58.5)	18.7 (65.7)	20.6 (69.1)	20.4 (68.7)	16.5 (61.7)	12.9 (55.2)	7.7 (45.9)	4.6 (40.3)	12.0 (53.6)
Mean daily minimum °C (°F)	−0.1 (31.8)	−0.2 (31.6)	1.9 (35.4)	4.5 (40.1)	8.3 (46.9)	11.9 (53.4)	13.4 (56.1)	13.2 (55.8)	9.9 (49.8)	7.6 (45.7)	3.5 (38.3)	0.6 (33.1)	6.2 (43.2)
Record low °C (°F)	−17.6 (0.3)	−17.1 (1.2)	−15.1 (4.8)	−10.8 (12.6)	−1.2 (29.8)	1.5 (34.7)	4.3 (39.7)	2.2 (36.0)	0.5 (32.9)	−9.1 (15.6)	−11.5 (11.3)	−15.8 (3.6)	−17.6 (0.3)
Average precipitation mm (inches)	27.9 (1.10)	23.3 (0.92)	32.2 (1.27)	54.2 (2.13)	76.3 (3.00)	63.2 (2.49)	62.2 (2.45)	71.2 (2.80)	53.5 (2.11)	59.6 (2.35)	54.8 (2.16)	32.3 (1.27)	610.7 (24.04)
Average precipitation days (≥ 1.0 mm)	6.7	6.2	7.3	8.1	9.5	7.5	7.8	8.0	6.6	8.1	9.2	6.5	91.4
Mean monthly sunshine hours	82.7	101.7	153.1	173.3	201.0	240.6	255.4	233.7	173.2	123.5	82.5	78.1	1,898.6
Source: Meteociel

== History ==
Issoire (Iciodurum) is said to have been founded by the Arverni, and in Roman times rose to some reputation for its schools. In the 5th century the Christian community established there by Stremonius in the same century was overthrown by the fury of the Vandals.

During the religious wars of the Reformation, Issoire suffered very severely. Merle, the leader of the Protestants, captured the town in 1574, and treated the inhabitants with great cruelty. The Roman Catholics retook it in 1577, and the ferocity of their retaliation may be inferred from the inscription "Ici fut Issoire" ("Here was Issoire") carved on a pillar which was raised on the site of the town. In the contest between the Leaguers and Henry IV, Issoire sustained further sieges, and never wholly regained its early prosperity.

== Population ==
Historical population
Year	Pop.	±% p.a.
1968	11,886	—
1975	13,673	+2.02%
1982	13,674	+0.00%
1990	13,559	−0.11%
1999	13,773	+0.17%
2007	13,996	+0.20%
2012	14,296	+0.43%
2017	14,822	+0.73%
2023	15,115	+0.33%
Source: INSEE

== Economy ==
Voxan motorcycles were manufactured at Issoire. Also, tourists often visit the village to see the church of Saint-Austremoine.

== Sights ==
The church of Saint-Austremoine is built on the site of an older chapel raised over the tomb of St. Austremoine (Stremonius), and affords an excellent specimen of the Romanesque architecture of Auvergne. There is also a clock tower and the museum of the philosopher's stone.

== People born in Issoire ==
- François Albert-Buisson
- Agénor Altaroche
- Auguste Bravard
- Antoine Duprat
- François George-Hainl
- Auguste Pomel
- Florent Sauvadet
- Marguerite Tinayre

== Twin towns ==
- Neumarkt in der Oberpfalz, Germany, since 1971.

== See also ==
- Communes of the Puy-de-Dôme department
