= Étienne de La Grange =

French politician

Étienne de La Grange (died 26 November 1388) was a French politician of the group of counselors of kings Charles V and Charles VI designated as the Marmousets by their detractors. He was the brother of Cardinal Jean de La Grange. Knighted in 1371, he was elected president of the parliament in 1373, where he was a consultant from 1369.

Of his marriage to Marie du Bois, he had a daughter named Jacqueline, married to Jean de Montaigu who served Charles VI in many functions of the state.

== Sources ==
- Le Roux de Lincy, Les femmes célèbres de l'ancienne France: mémoires historiques sur la vie publique et privée des femmes franc̜aises, depuis le cinquième siècle jusq'ua dix-huitième, Leroi (1848), p. 425. (in French)
