= Treaty of Bruges (1375) =

Truce of Bruges (1375)
- Type: Time-limited truce
- Context: Hundred Years' War
- Signed: 27 June 1375, extended on 12 March 1376
- Location: Bruges
- Expiration: 24 June 1377
- Signatories: John of Gaunt; Philip the Bold
- Parties: Kingdom of England; Kingdom of France

The Treaty of Bruges of 1375 (also known as the Truce of Bruges and the Conference of Bruges) was a truce between the Kingdoms of England and France during the Hundred Years' War. It was signed on 27 June 1375 for one year, then extended on 12 March 1376 to 24 June 1377. King Charles V of France retained the territories conquered during his previous military operations. The Duchy of Brittany is returned to France, except Brest, Auray, and Berval, which remain the possessions of John IV of Brittany.

== Background ==
The second phase of the Hundred Years' War gave advantage to the French. In total, between 1369 and 1375, King of France Charles V took back almost all the territories lost before 1369 and even land owned by the English before the start of the war, with the exceptions of Calais, Cherbourg, Brest, Bordeaux, Bayonne, and some fortresses in the Massif Central. But at this point, Charles V knew he could not regain more ground, and the inhabitants of the Bordeaux region were inclined to support the English because of their commercial ties (they exported their wine on a massive scale to England). Since his strategy was based on winning back hearts before that of territories, he did not want to burden himself with cities ready to rebel at the first opportunity. The road was thus open to negotiate a treaty ending the war in Bruges by recognizing the sovereignty of the French over the reconquered territories.

== The scene ==
Bruges and its cloth industry, dependent on wool imports across the Channel, was a pro-English city in French territory. Its ease of access for the English made it a neutral ground favorable for negotiations. Philip the Bold, Duke of Burgundy, son-in-law and heir of the Count of Flanders Louis de Male, was the negotiator for the French. He was assisted by a team of advisers sent by Charles V: the bishop of Amiens Jean de La Grange, Hugues de Châtillon, lord of Dampierre and Roullamcourt and Master of Crossbowmen, the count of Tancarville (Bertrand Du Guesclin), the count of Saarbrücken Jean IV of Saarbrücken-Commercy, Arnaud de Corbie (the first president of the Parlement), Bureau de La Rivière, Johan Harlaston, Johan Shepeye doctor in law, Enguerran Dendiu lord of Chastiamullan, and Nicolas du Bosc. The Duke of Lancaster, John of Gaunt, represented Edward III on the English side. Among his advisers was the future religious reformer John Wycliffe.

== The negotiations ==
Philip, Duke of Burgundy, first hosted sumptuous banquets and games, and then the first negotiating session began on 25 March 1375 in the church of Saint-Donatien in Bruges. It resulted in two plans for the partition of Gascony, which the duke, after consulting his council, rejected because these plans would result in the recognition of the sovereignty of England over part of the French territory. Under the influence of Pope Gregory XI, the belligerents signed a truce on 1 July 1375, which lasted until June 1377.

The second session was again held in Bruges between the end of December 1375 and the end of March 1376. The papal legate, to get around the thorny problem of sovereignty, proposed a 40-year truce, which was refused by both parties: the English because Brittany was occupied by the troops of Charles V and the French because they wanted to include Castile in the treaty to secure the throne of King Henry II after John of Gaunt advanced his claims to Castile. (Note: John of Gaunt claimed the throne in right of his wife, Constance of Castille, a daughter of king Peter of Castile, and tried to conquer it by force with the help of Portugal.)

The third session opened in July 1376, this time conducted by advisers to the kings. Charles V proposed to recognize the sovereignty of Edward III over the lands of Gascony located to the south of the Dordogne, to return Agenais, Bigorre, Quercy, Bazadais to him and to pay him the 1,200,000 francs still due from the ransom of John II of France in exchange for Calais and on the condition that this new duchy of Gascony remains in the territory of the kingdom of France (he did not consent to any surrender of sovereignty). This implies that Edward III as the Duke of Gascony must pay homage to him, that all legal judgements can be called into question by the Court of Paris and that the duchy could possibly be confiscated. On this occasion, the bishop of Chartres Jean Le Fèvre developed a thesis that gradually became accepted: the king could not alienate the rights of the crown; the inalienable character of sovereignty is sacred. Edward III refused the proposed terms and died on 21 June 1377. Hostilities resumed.
