= Bureau de La Rivière =

French politician and royal Adviser (died 1400)

Bureau de La Rivière was a French politician, knight and royal adviser. He was the chamberlain of Charles V the Wise and an advisor to Charles VI the Beloved. Like Bertrand du Guesclin and Louis de Sancerre, he was buried in the Basilica of St Denis at the feet of the king he had loyally served.

== Biography ==
Of all the servants of Charles V, de la Rivière was the closest to the French sovereign. More than a chamberlain, he was a friend of the king and had his confidence. Charles V entrusted him with his feelings, his innermost thoughts, and his pains and joys.

Like Charles V, de La Rivière was a modest person, and like the king he had an amiable disposition and was endowed with great intelligence. Despite his position as chamberlain, he actively took part in the management of the kingdom of France. Charles V often made use of de la Rivière's diplomatic skills, an area where he excelled. He was sent for when the King's health suddenly worsened in September 1380, arriving at the manor of Beauté-sur-Marne in time for Charles to die in his arms. In his will of October 1374, Charles V appointed him executor of the king as proof of his eternal confidence in him.

Charles V's son Charles VI remembered the excellent services rendered to his father by de La Rivière. In October 1388 he called the old chamberlain to be one of the members of the King's Council, together with Jean Le Mercier and Jean de Montaigu, former advisers of the late Charles V. He was one of the marmousets of Charles VI. In 1392, after the first attacks of insanity of Charles VI, he was deprived of his office and imprisoned by the king's uncles. He died on 16 August 1400.
