= Gérard de Montaigu =

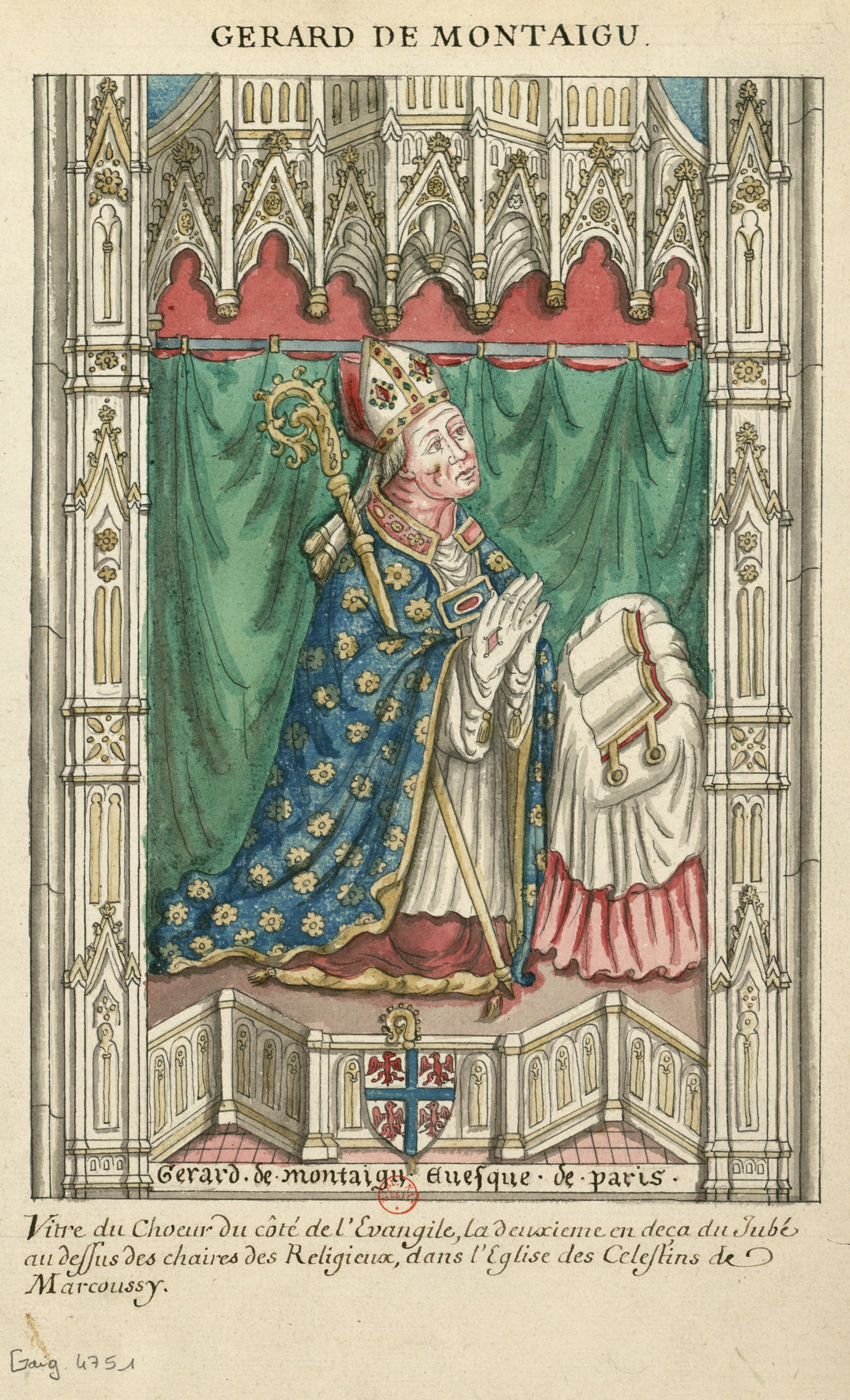
- Watercolor of a stained-glass window from the church of the Celestines monastery in Marcoussis, depicting Gérard de Montaigu

Personal details
- Died: 25 September 1420
- Parents: Gérard de Montaigu; Biette de Cassinel

Bishop of Poitiers
- In office 1403–1409
- Preceded by: Ythier de Mareuil
- Succeeded by: Pierre Trousseau

Bishop of Paris
- In office 1409–1420
- Preceded by: Pierre d'Orgemont
- Succeeded by: Jean Courtecuisse

Gérard de Montaigu (died 25th of September 1420) was Bishop of Poitiers from 1405 to 1409 and Bishop of Paris from 1409 until his death.

== Life ==
Gérard was the son of Gerard, lord of Montaigu, and Biette de Cassinel. He was the brother of Jean de Montagu, advisor and treasurer of Charles V and Charles VI, and Jean, bishop of Sens.

He was elected as bishop of Poitiers in 1405, before being transferred to Paris in 1409.

After the execution of his brother Jean that same year, he was not allowed to bury his body and, as such, fled with his brother's family to Savoy. He only returned to Paris in 1412, after being allowed to bury the body of his brother.

In 1413 he was nominated president of the Cour des Comptes.

That same year, Gerard was asked by Charles VI to convene with the inquisitor of France and the foremost doctors of theology to evaluate the thesis of Jean Petit, who had written an apologetic of the assassination of Louis I, Duke of Orléans. Jean petite's thesis were rejected.

He was chancellor to John, Duke of Berry.

He died in Vallères on the 25th of September 1420.

Catholic Church titles
Preceded by Ythier de Mareuil	Bishop of Poitiers; 1403 - 1409	Succeeded by Pierre Trousseau
Preceded by Pierre d'Orgemont	Bishop of Paris; 1409 - 1420	Succeeded by Jean Courtecuisse
