= Anjou Bible =

Illuminated 14th century manuscript

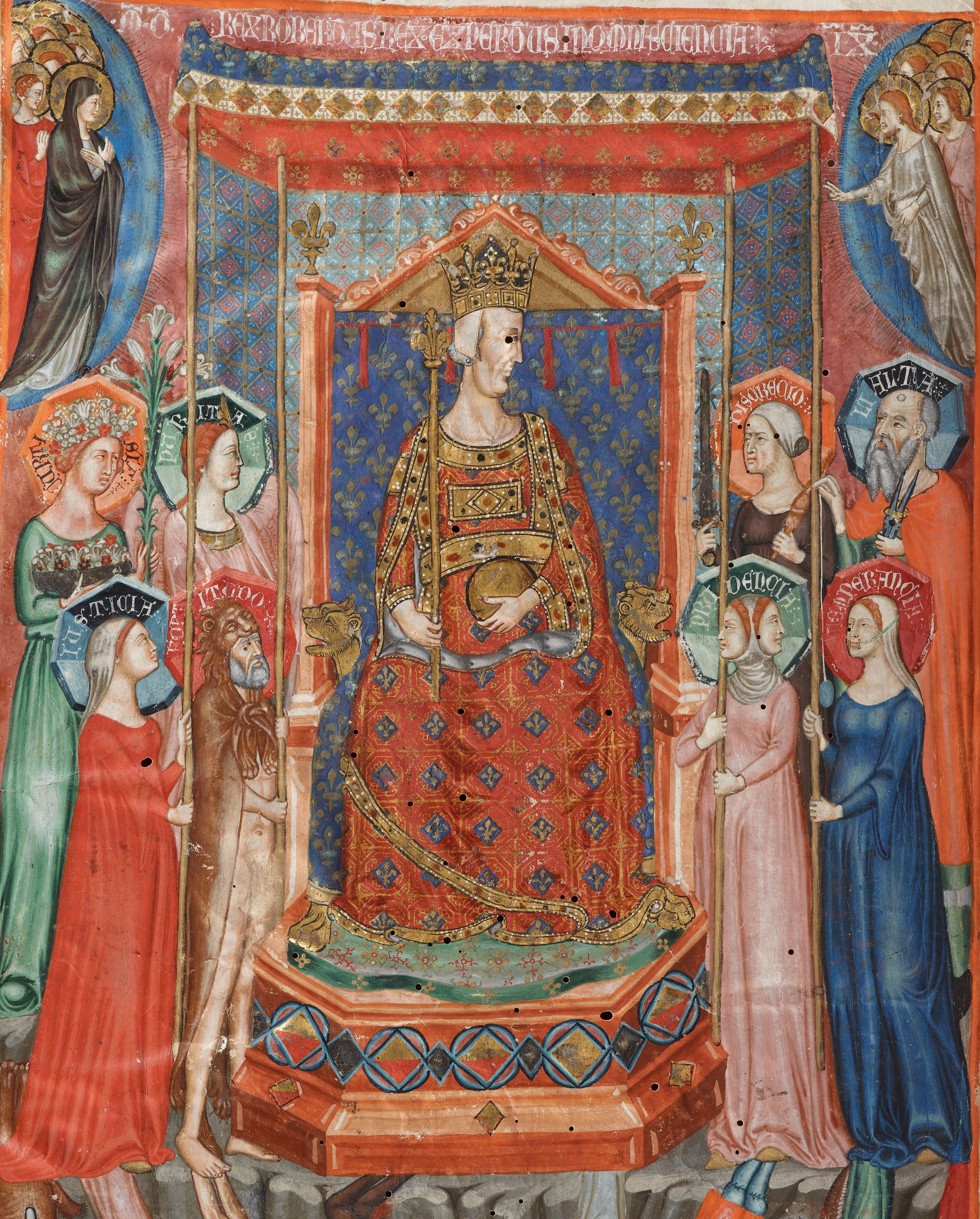
Left panel (detail) of the opening diptych of the Anjou Bible, depicting Robert I of Anjou (illuminated by Cristophorus di Orimina)

The Anjou Bible, or Bible Angevine, is an illustrated manuscript created c. 1340 in the court of King Robert I of Naples and Sicily (also known as Robert I of Anjou). In older literature, it is also referred to as the Malines Bible, indicating its former location at the Grand Seminary in Mechelen.

The Anjou Bible consists of 344 folios with two full-page illustrations and over 80 small miniatures, dated initials, and marginal miniatures. The work is considered a masterpiece of 14th-century Italian literature.

The manuscript is held by the Catholic University of Leuven's Faculty of Theology and Religious Studies (Maurits Sabbe Library, Hs 1). On March 10, 2008, it was included in the List of Movable Cultural Heritage of the Flemish Community.

== Description ==
The Anjou Bible measures 420 mm × 280 mm and contains 344 parchment folios.

The biblical text, written in Latin, is the work of a single scribe, Iannutius de Matrice, who wrote in the colophon on folio 312r: (Note: folio 312 recto) "Qui sripsit scribat semper cum domino vivat. Ianuttius de matrice incepit, mediavit et finivit hoc opus." The text is written in two columns measuring 265 mm × 80 mm, in an Italian Gothic script. The rubrics are written in red.

The Anjou Bible includes nearly the entire text of Jerome's Vulgate, including both the Old Testament (folios 5r to 248v) and the New Testament (folios 249r to 312v), with an index of the Hebrew names used at the end (folios 313r to 340v). This last section was written in three columns, each 60 mm wide.

The quires consist of five bifolia, with some exceptions. The first bifolium was inserted after the completion of the Bible and is slightly smaller than the other quires; the outer side of it is left blank, and the inner side features full-page miniatures depicting the dynasty of the House of Anjou in Naples. The second quire is a quaternion; originally, it was also a quinion (a quire consisting of five bifolia), but one bifolium was removed. The 19th quire is a quaternion, and the 33rd is a trinion (a quire consisting of three bifolia).

Due to damage to the parchment and illustration caused by tight binding in the early twentieth century, a conservation project was initiated in May 2008. Its goal was to stabilize the current state of the Anjou Bible as much as possible through methods such as stabilizing ink and paint layers. As a part of this effort, folios were on display from September 17 to December 5, 2010, at Museum M in Leuven.

A monographic study titled The Bible of Anjou: A Royal Manuscript Revealed was published in 2010, which featured contributions from an international team of researchers. In 2011, the Bible of Anjou was fully digitized and rebound in red calf leather. The Bible of Anjou is available online. In 2022, a copy of the Bible was produced by Treccani in Rome, and in 2023, the Second Revised Edition of the monograph was released.

== History ==
=== Origins ===
The Anjou Bible was likely commissioned by Robert I of Anjou as a gift for his granddaughter Joanna and Andreas of Hungary on the occasion of their marriage in 1342. Andreas of Hungary was a grandson of Robert's brother, Charles Martel of Anjou.

Robert's father, Charles II of Naples, appointed him as his successor in 1297, after the death of his eldest brother Charles Martel in 1295. Charles Martel also had a son, who would have been his designated heir, namely Charles I of Hungary (usually called Charles Robert or Carobert in literature), the father of Andreas.

At the time of their engagement in 1333, Joanna and Andreas were seven and six years old, respectively. The marriage took place in the spring of 1342. The marriage agreement stipulated that Andreas and Joanna would become kings, but in his will drawn up on January 16, 1343, Robert decided to reserve the royal title of queen for his granddaughter. Joanna was crowned queen alone in August 1344 in Santa Chiara, Naples.

Andreas was murdered in September 1345. In revenge for his brother's death, Louis I of Hungary forcibly conquered Naples. Joanna fled to Provence, presented herself before the Pope in Avignon to prove her innocence, was acquitted, and returned to Naples two years later to reclaim her throne. She remained a powerful queen of Naples in a period filled with conflict and wars.

Earlier studies suggested that the intended recipient of the Bible was Nicolo d'Alifio, advisor of Robert and Joanna, whose coat of arms frequently appears throughout the Bible. The Bible likely came into his possession as a gift from Queen Joanna when she fled to France in 1345. An explicit mention of Nicolo can be found at the end of the manuscript, on folio 309r in the text surrounding the painted miniature: "Hec est Blibia [sic] magistri Nicolai de Alifio doctor quam illuminavit de pincello Cristophorus Orimina de Neapoli". (Note: Freely translated: "This Bible is by master Nicolai de Alifio doctor and it was illuminated with the brush by Cristoforo Orimina of Naples.") His coat of arms is painted more than one hundred times over the original coats of arms in the lower border of the miniatures.

=== Transfer of possession ===
What happened to the manuscript after it came into the possession of d'Alifio is not documented. Its earliest appearance thereafter is in a 1402 inventory of the books of Jean, Duke of Berry. The book is again described in a 1413 inventory, which explicitly states that it was given to the Duke of Berry by Louis d'Orléans on the 18th day of August in the year 1407, just a few months before Louis was murdered. In a 1416 inventory, the work was again cataloged and given an estimated value of 250 livres tournois. The book was part of a list of possessions that the Duke had reserved testamentary for the heirs of Jean de Montaigu. François Avril concludes that the work, before it came into the possession of Jean de Berry, may have belonged to the king's grandmaster, Jean de Montaigu, who was beheaded in 1409. A document from 1418 informs us that the items reserved for the heirs of Montaigu were auctioned on March 18, 1418, by order of Charles VI. The Anjou Bible was then sold for 125 livres tournois to Galiache Pinel, a merchant in Paris, for a price well below the value estimated in 1416.

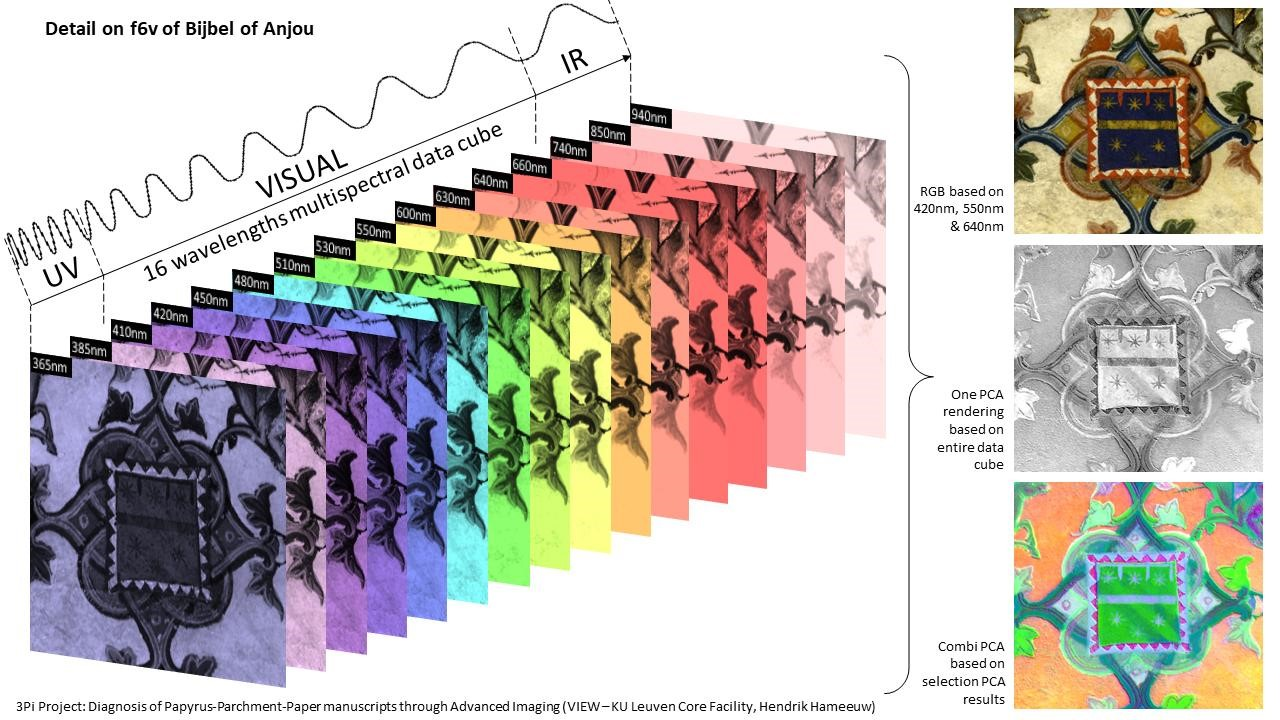
Detail of folio 6v of the Anjou Bible. Multispectral data cube visualising the coat of arms of d'Alifio and the underlying original coat of arms.

Afterward, the manuscript came into the possession of Nicolaas le Ruistre (or Ruterius), bishop of Arras and chancellor at the University of Leuven. Through him, the Bible ended up in the Arras College in Leuven around the beginning of the sixteenth century. The first reference was in 1547 when the Anjou Bible was included in a list of printed and handwritten Bibles used in the preparation of the text of the Leuven Bible. After the dissolution of the University by the French occupiers in 1797, the Anjou Bible was transferred to the Grand Seminary in Mechelen. It is mentioned in the catalogs from 1821. In 1974, the manuscript was transmitted to the Maurits Sabbe Library of the Faculty of Theology and Religious Studies at KU Leuven.

The Anjou Bible is being examined and conserved in the Book Heritage Lab (Expertisecentrum voor Onderzoek en Conservering van Documentair Erfgoed) KU Leuven, a multi-year project led by Lieve Watteeuw in collaboration with the Core Facility VIEW, the Royal Institute for Cultural Heritage, and the Imaging Lab of KU Leuven Libraries.

== Illumination ==
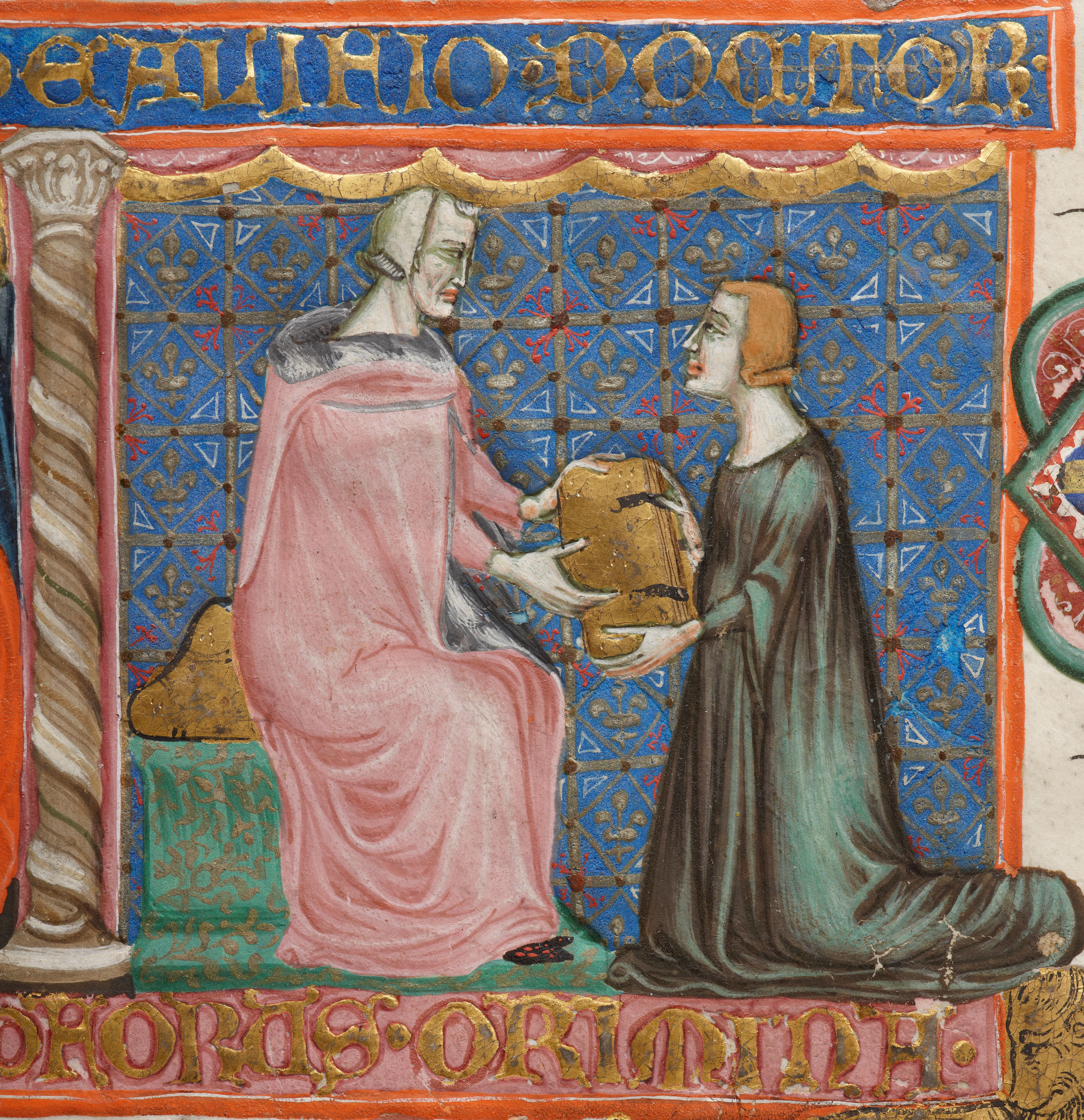
The name of Neapolitan illuminator Cristophorus di Orimina is found on folio 309r.

The illumination was carried out by three groups of illuminators. One of them, whose name is found on folio 309r, is the renowned Neapolitan illuminator Cristophorus di Orimina. In addition to his work on the Anjou Bible, Orimina is known for contributing to more than 40 manuscripts in the period from 1335 to the early 1360s. His extensive production suggests that he worked with a workshop, yet the quality remains consistently high and homogeneous. This would imply that he personally completed most of the miniatures.

The manuscript was illuminated under Orimina's guidance by his workshop. He painted, among other things, the two full-page miniatures at the beginning of the work, which essentially open the book like a diptych. A second group of illuminators is responsible for the remaining marginal decorations, the historiated initials, and the small miniatures. The third illuminator worked several decades later; he was responsible for adjustments to the illumination when the manuscript came into the possession of d'Alifio. He painted, among other things, the fantasy birds with long necks and tails in soft pastel colors, which are frequently found in the margins to conceal repairs to the parchment.

The parchment had irregular quality, and differences in thickness within a folio were sometimes significant, leading to deep folds at the edges. Excess parchment was then cut away, and the cut edges were glued back together to obtain a flat sheet. These repairs were camouflaged with elegant border decorations.

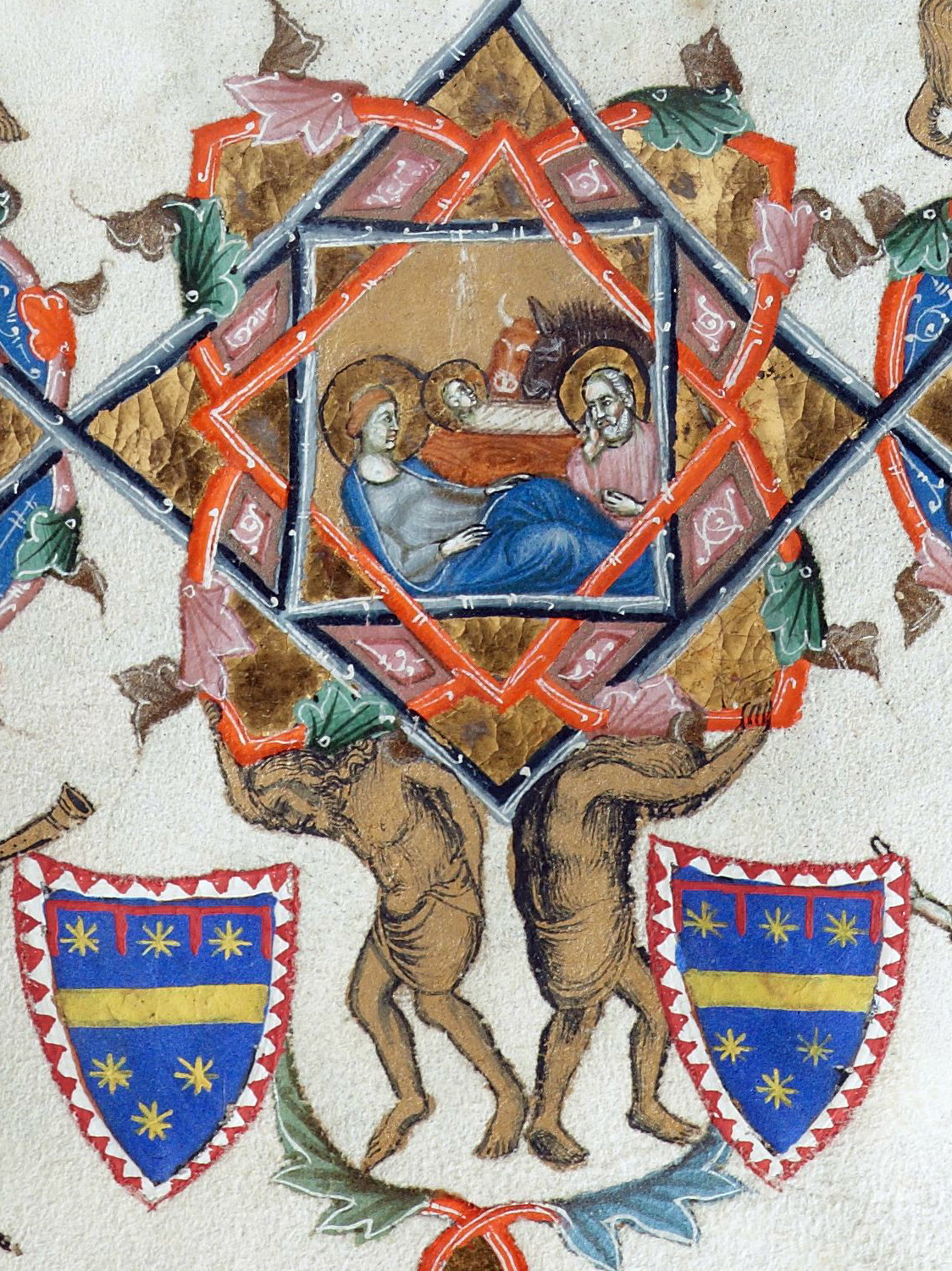
Miniature of the Nativity carried by two colossi, depicted on folio 230r

The manuscript begins with two full-page miniatures placed opposite each other. (Note: All miniatures can be viewed on The Anjou Bible (start on page 12). Archived 8 November 2020.) The rest of the manuscript consists of text containing small painted miniatures and historiated initials, which depict images related to the text and indicate the beginning of a prologue, chapter, or book of the Bible. The historiated initials vary in height, usually between 6 and 10 lines, and up to more than half of the text block. The small miniatures are usually 16 to 17 lines high in the Old Testament, and between 16 and 43 lines in the New Testament.

Book chapters start with a decorated initial, two lines high, painted in color on a background of burnished gold. The chapter numbers are also indicated in Roman numerals in the margin or at the end of the line (see, for example, f17r).

Margin decorations very rarely pertain to the biblical text. These page embellishments include flower motifs, acanthus, grotesques, fantasy animals, birds, peacocks, musicians, faces, acrobats, winged putti, scenes of battles, hunting scenes, scenes from court life, and images of the royal family.

== Political message ==
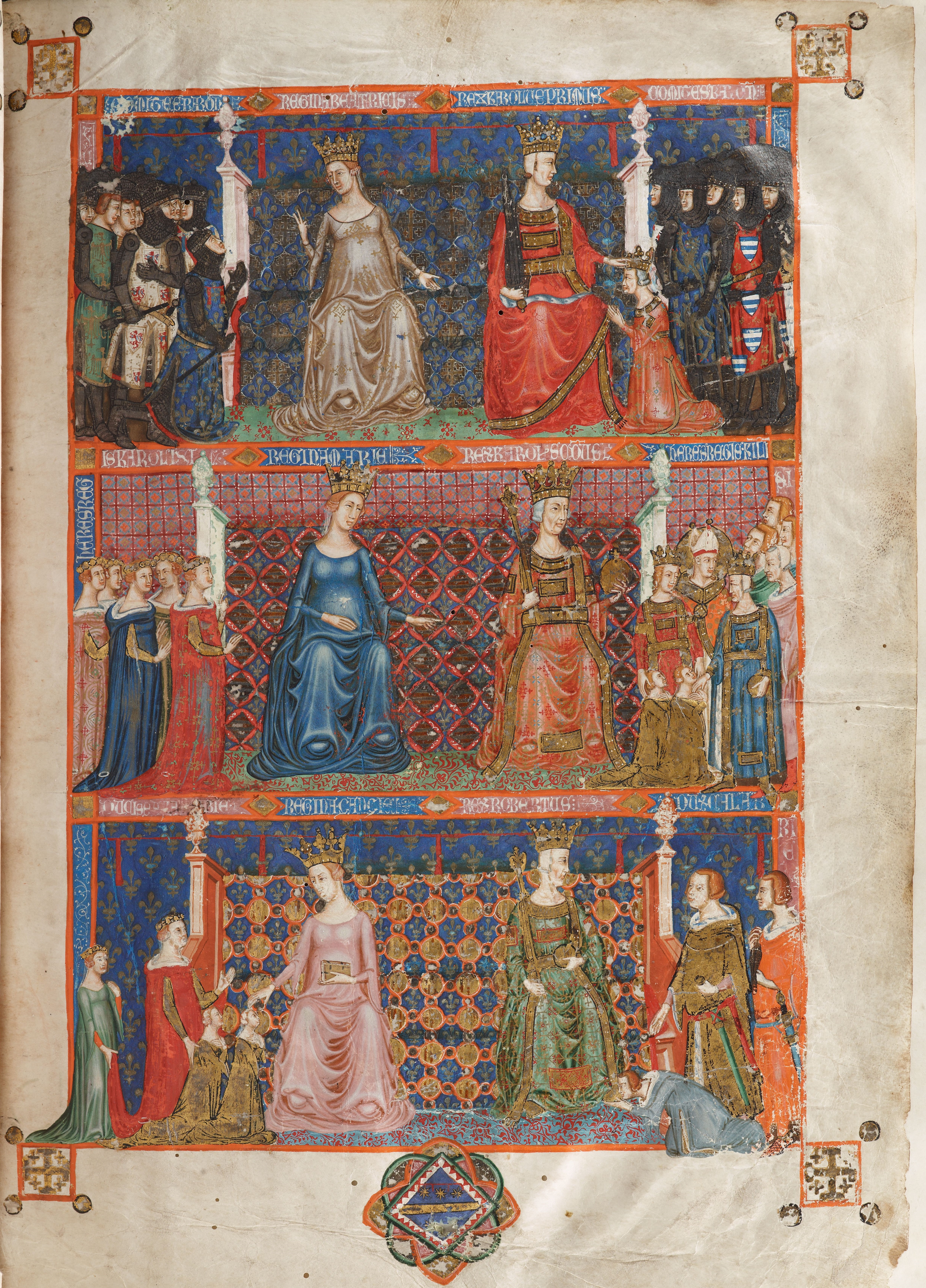
Right panel of the opening diptych of the Anjou Bible, depicting the genealogy of the dynasty of the Anjou in Naples (by Cristophoro di Orimina)

It is likely that Robert I of Anjou intended to make a political statement with the Bible. The two opening miniatures illustrate this.

In the left miniature, Robert is enthroned and robed like a Byzantine emperor, and flanked by personifications of the eight virtues that defeat and cast the eight vices into the abyss. He had himself titled as the "Rex Expertus in Omnia Scientia" ('the king expert in all sciences').

In the right miniature, a family tree emphasizes dynastic greatness. At the top are Charles I of Anjou and his spouse Beatrice of Provence, the founders of the Capetian House of Anjou in Naples and Sicily. He is surrounded by armored Neapolitan barons. Kneeling at his feet is his son and successor, the future Charles II. In the middle field of the miniature, Charles II and Maria of Hungary are depicted. Next to Maria are her daughters, and next to Charles II is Charles Martel, his eldest son, and a bishop with a halo, Saint Louis of Toulouse, his second son. Next to them is Robert I of Anjou in royal dress; kneeling at his feet are his two granddaughters, Joanna (who succeeded him) and her sister Maria. At the bottom of the third part of the miniature are Robert I of Anjou and his second wife Sancia of Majorca. To the left of the queen is Maria of Valois, Duchess of Calabria, with her two daughters, Joanna and Maria. Next to Robert is his son Charles of Calabria. This miniature illustrates the succession within the Angevin dynasty, and makes it clear that Robert had chosen his granddaughter Joanna to succeed him after the death of his son.

== Sources ==
- Fleck, Cathleen A. (2023). "Patronage, Art, and the Anjou Bible in Angevin Naples (1266-1350)". The Anjou Bible: A Royal Manuscript Revealed, Second Revised Edition. Peeters Publishers. pp. 51–56.
- François, Avril (1969). "Trois manuscrits napolitains des collections de Charles V et de Jean de Berry". Bibliothèque de l'école des chartes (tome 127, livraison 2): 291–328.
- Ghistelinck, Frans (2010). "The Anjou Bible: a treasure of the Maurits Sabbe library in Leuven". In L. Watteeuw; J. Van der Stock (eds.). The Anjou Bible: A Royal Manuscript Revealed, Naples 1340 BE. Peeters Publishers. pp. 27–29.
- "The Bible of Anjou continues to surprise". KU Leuven Stories. 23 May 2023.
- Perricioli Saggesse, Alessandra (2023). "Cristophoro Orimina: A Neapolitan illuminator facing the Giotto's frescoes". The Anjou Bible: a Royal Manuscript Revealed, Second Revised Edition. Peeters Publishers.
- Pierre Delsaerdt, of Arras College Library Leuven (2023). "The academic habitat of the Anjou Bible for three centuries". The Anjou Bible: A Royal Manuscript Revealed, Second Revised Edition. Peeters Publishers. pp. 148–155.
- Watteeuw, Lieve; Jan Van der Stock, eds. (2010). The Anjou Bible: A Royal Manuscript Revealed, Naples 1340 BE. Peeters Publishers. ISBN 978-9042924451.
- Watteeuw, Lieve, ed. (2023). The Anjou Bible: A Royal Manuscript Revealed, Second Revised Edition. Peeters Publishers. ISBN 978-9042950849.
- Watteeuw, Lieve; Marina Van Bos (2023). "The practice of Illuminating, with pen as well with brush; The Techniques and Materials of the workshop of Cristophorus Orimina". The Anjou Bible: A Royal Manuscript Revealed, Second Revised Edition. Peeters Publishers. pp. 156–1765.
