= Nicolas du Bosc =

French politician (died 1408)

Nicolas du Bosc, or du Bois, was a French politician, advisor to kings Charles V and Charles VI of France. He was one of the marmousets appointed by his detractors who took the governing of France from November 1392.

== Biography ==
Born in Rouen, he was the son of Martin du Bosc and Guillemette du Valricher. Bachelor lecturer of civil and canon law from 1354, he enters the parliament as clerk and attorney advisor of investigations. In 1374, he was master of requests de l'Hôtel du Roi. In 1375, Nicolas du Bosc was appointed Bishop of Bayeux and became advisor to King Charles V. In 1379, he was appointed general councillor of aid.

Dismissed by the uncles of Charles VI during his illness, he returned to power in 1388. Ten years later, he became the first president of the Court of Finances. The same year he replaces Arnaud de Corbie as Keeper of the Seals of France. When Corbie returned to power in 1400, he was dismissed of his duties because of his age. He died on 19 September 1408.
