= Cristoforo Orimina =

Italian painter

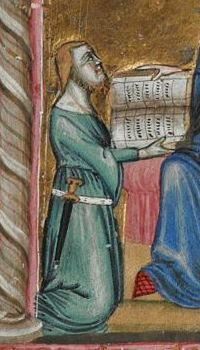
Self-portrait of Cristoforo Orimina. Detail of a miniature from the Anjou Bible, folio 311r

Cristoforo Orimina was an Italian illuminator of the 14th century. He was a painter at the court of Robert of Naples and of Joan I of Naples.

The Orimini were a patrician family of Naples, belonging to the noble seggio of Capuana. The family's residence was in what is now the Via dei Cimbri.

Cristoforo identified himself on the last leaf of an illuminated manuscript Bible. Stylistic comparison allows numerous other manuscript illuminations to be attributed to Cristoforo's hand or workshop. One of the best known of these works is the Hamilton Bible, now in Berlin.

== Sources ==
- C. De Clercq, "Le miniaturiste napolitain Cristoforo Orimina", Gutenberg Jahrbuch, 1968, pp. 52–65.
