= Hamilton Bible =

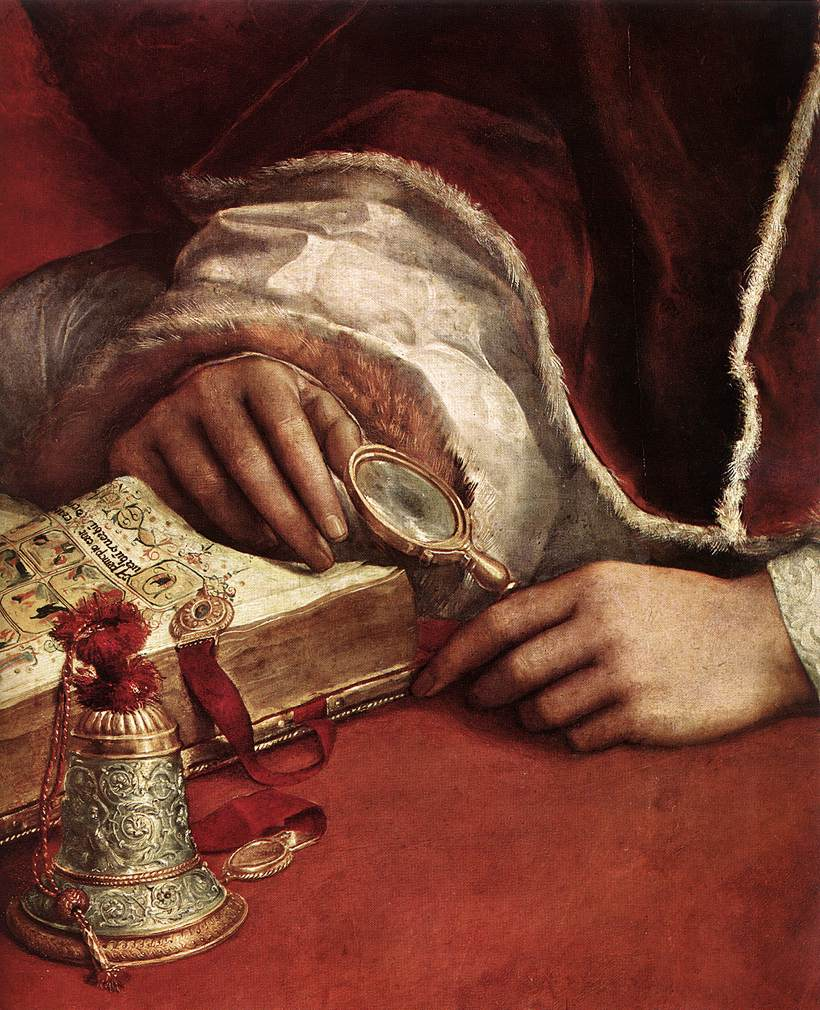
The Hamilton Bible depicted opened in Raphael's Portrait of Leo X (detail)

The Hamilton Bible (Berlin, Kupferstichkabinett 78 E 3) is a fourteenth-century illuminated manuscript Bible, commissioned by the Angevin court in Naples and illustrated by the workshop of Cristoforo Orimina around 1350.

It was part of the Hamilton Collection of medieval manuscripts, formed by Alexander Hamilton, 10th Duke of Hamilton, and acquired by the Berlin State Library in 1884, and is currently held in the Kupferstichkabinett Berlin, with call number 78 E 3.

It has been identified that the Bible open on the table in Raphael's Portrait of Leo X is the Hamilton Bible.
