= Portrait of Leo X =

Painting by Raphael

Portrait of Pope Leo X
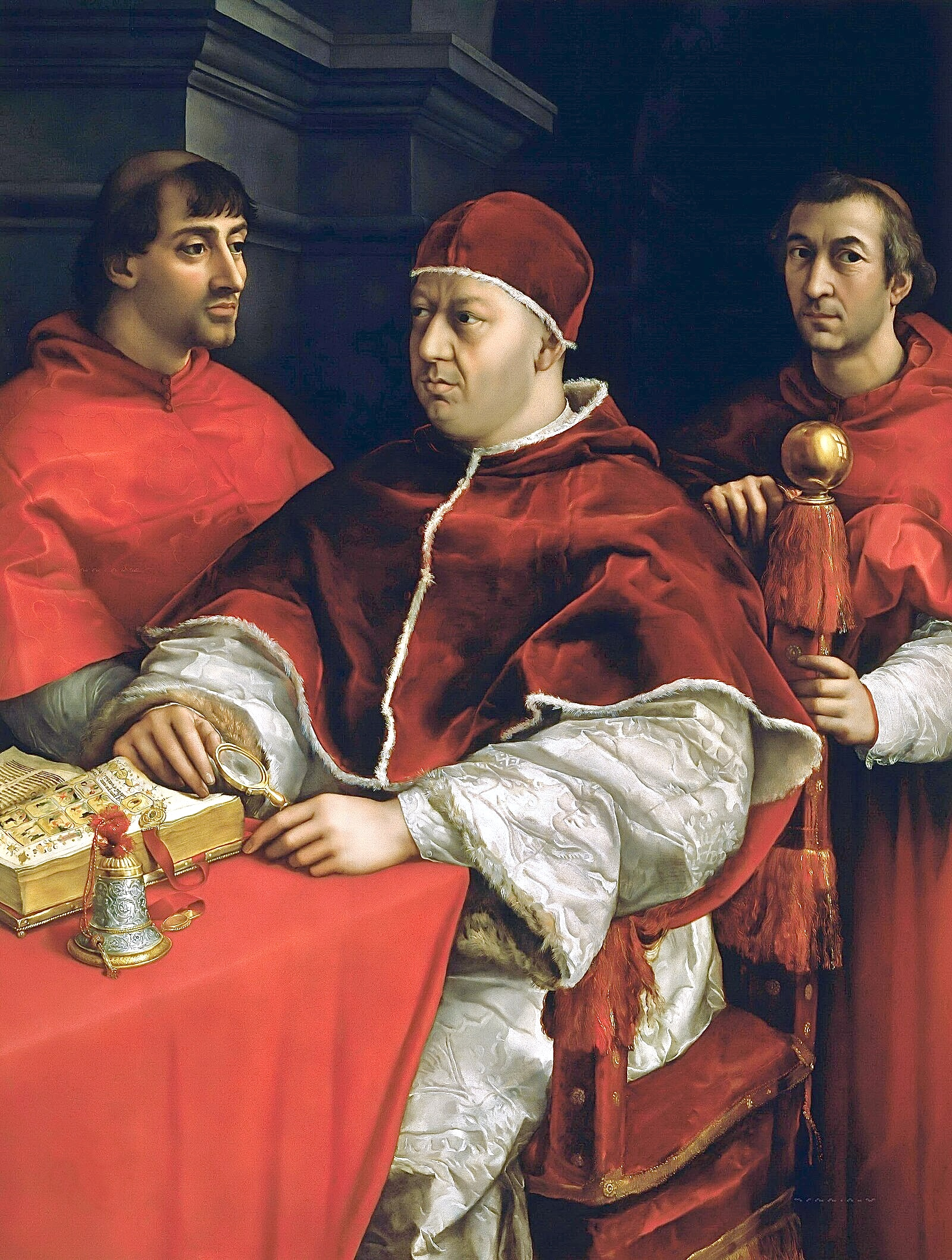
- Artist: Raphael
- Year: c. 1518–1520
- Medium: Oil on wood
- Dimensions: 154 cm × 119 cm (61 in × 47 in)
- Location: Uffizi, Florence

The Portrait of Pope Leo X with two Cardinals, also known as Portrait of Pope Leo X with the cardinals Giulio de' Medici e Luigi de' Rossi (Italian: Ritratto di Leone X con i cardinali Giulio de' Medici e Luigi de' Rossi), is a painting by the Italian High Renaissance master Raphael, executed c. 1518–1520. It is housed in the Uffizi Gallery of Florence.

== Historical context ==
Pope Leo X (1475–1521) led the Catholic Church from 1513 to 1521. He was born in Florence Giovanni Lorenzo de' Medici; the second son of the founder of the Medici dynasty, Lorenzo de' Medici, also known as "Lorenzo the Magnificent".

Pope Leo X financed works of St. Peter's Basilica (as well the War of Urbino to benefit the Medici's) by selling indulgences, for which he was harshly criticized by Martin Luther in 1517, which happened at the time the portrait by Raphael was started.

== History ==
The large portrait of the Pope arrived in Florence in 1518, to represent the pope at the wedding of his nephew Lorenzo de' Medici, Duke of Urbino with the French noblewoman Madeleine de La Tour d'Auvergne, relative of King Francis I of France.

Vasari in his Lives provides a detailed description that shows the admiration this painting generated in its time:

In Rome he made a picture of good size, in which he portrayed Pope Leo, Cardinal Giulio de’ Medici, and Cardinal de’ Rossi. In this the figures appear to be not painted, but in full relief; there is the pile of the velvet, with the damask of the Pope’s vestments shining and rustling, the fur of the linings soft and natural, and the gold and silk so counterfeited that they do not seem to be in color, but real gold and silk. There is an illuminated book of parchment, which appears more real than the reality; and a little bell of wrought silver, which is more beautiful than words can tell. Among other things, also, is a ball of burnished gold on the Pope’s chair, wherein are reflected, as if it were a mirror (such is its brightness), the light from the windows, the shoulders of the Pope, and the walls round the room. And all these things are executed with such diligence, that one may believe without any manner of doubt that no master is able, or is ever likely to be able, to do better.

Various copies were made, including one by Vasari in 1536.

In 1589 the original was inventoried at the Uffizi, and from 1799 to 1816 it was in France where Napoleon had it taken.

A major exhibition dedicated to this work was held by the Uffizi in 2020 to celebrate the completion of its restoration. The detailed technical analysis performed as part of this restoration dispelled the belief of several scholars that the figures of the two cardinals had been added by another painter later.

== Style and description ==
With this portrait, Raphael continued innovating the tradition of how popes were depicted, which he had started with his Portrait of Pope Julius II, painted six years before in 1511.

For centuries, popes where usually painted in profile and with indistinct facial features, showing them as idealized characters, kneeling in a religious scene of giving their blessing. Raphael chose to depict them as real human beings, with very distinct facial features and expressions. Pope Julius II is shown as an exhausted, old pontiff, while Pope Leo X is shown as a middle-aged man with a worried, frowning expression.

In the painting, the pope is wearing a camauro on his head and a mozzetta with an ermine edge (as is still the privilege of pontiffs, worn November 1st to Easter). He holds a gold-rimmed monocle that he needed due to his myopia.

He is seated on a chair with a golden knob that reflects a window and the room with an optical realism reminiscent of Early Netherlandish painting masters (such as the mirror scene in Arnolfini Portrait, by Jan van Eyck). The table in front of him is covered by an orange-red cloth, on top of which is a richly decorated silver bell and an illuminated Bible.

The Bible is open at the beginning of the Gospel of St. John. It was made around the mid-14th century in Naples and is still in existence. Called the Hamilton Bible as it was part of the collection of the Scottish politician Alexander Hamilton, 10th Duke of Hamilton, it is preserved in the Kupferstich-Kabinett, Dresden.

Vasari indicates that the cardinal to the left is Giulio di Giuliano de' Medici (the future Pope Clement VII), while the other cardinal resting his hand on the pope's chair is Luigi de' Rossi, who was a maternal cousin of the other two portrayed.

== See also ==
- List of paintings by Raphael
