= Luigi de' Rossi =

Italian Roman Catholic cardinal priest of San Clemente

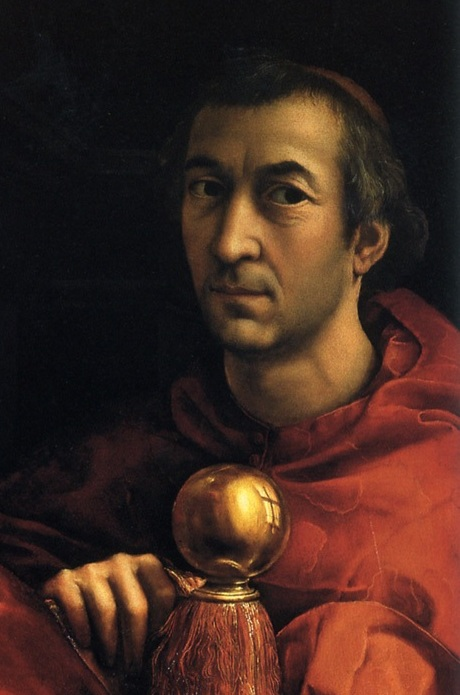
- Detail from Raphael's Portrait of Leo X
- Born: 6 August 1474; Florence, Republic of Florence
- Died: 20 August 1519 (aged 45); Rome, Papal States
- Known for: Depicted in Raphael's Portrait of Leo X
- Title: Cardinal priest of San Clemente
- Term: 6 July 1517 – 20 August 1519
- Predecessor: Giulio de Medici
- Successor: Domenico Giacobazzi
- Relatives: Pope Leo X (first cousin)

Luigi de' Rossi (1474–1519) was an Italian Roman Catholic cardinal of San Clemente, best known for wearing red cardinal's robes in Raphael's Portrait of Leo X, with his hand resting on the back of the pope's chair.

== Biography ==
Luigi de' Rossi was born in Florence on 6 August 1474, the son of Leonetto de' Rossi and Maria de' Medici, a member of the House of Medici. He was a first cousin of Giovanni de' Medici, the future Pope Leo X, on his mother's side. He and his cousin were educated together.

Early in his career, he became a protonotary apostolic. He is described as having had a room in the Torre Borgia in the papal apartment complex, and as being considered one of the pope's most confidential familiars.

Pope Leo X made him a cardinal priest in the consistory of 1 July 1517. He received the red hat and the titular church of San Clemente on 6 July 1517, succeeding Giulio.

He died in Rome on 20 August 1519. He was initially buried in St. Peter's Basilica; his remains were later transferred to Santa Felicita, Florence.
