= Jean Le Mercier =

French politician

Jean Le Mercier, who died 3 July 1397, Lord of Nouvion, was a French politician, advisor to kings Charles V and Charles VI. He was appointed by his detractors as being one the Marmousets. He was also Grand Master of France.

== Biography ==
In 1358 he was notary and secretary to the king, soon becoming one of the most trusted advisors of Charles VI. Appointed treasurer of wars in 1369, he performed on behalf of Charles VI several diplomatic missions of financial interest. Charles V. ennobled him in 1374 and named him general of aid. He was sent to Normandy in 1378 with the task of strengthening the fortifications, negotiating the surrender of those controlled by the party in Navarre, and also to proceed to the arming of a fleet. In 1383 he became steward of the king, assuming his post as general of aid again.

In 1388 he became one of the advisors to Charles VI, later recalled by his successor to take office as a member of the council of King Charles VI. Having amassed an enormous fortune, he became very unpopular and accused of speculation. In 1392, under the government of the dukes who governed France during the king's illness, he was deprived of his power. In 1394 all his properties were confiscated and he was then banished from the kingdom. He took refuge in Cambrai.
