= Biette de Cassinel =

Royal mistress of Charles V of France

Biette Cassinel (French pronunciation: [bjɛt də kasinɛl]; c.1320s-1394) was the supposed royal mistress of Charles V of France from 1360 until 1363. (Note: "Although Biette Cassinel has been attached occasionally to Charles V, no concrete evidence for a relationship exists.")

Biette was the daughter of the François Cassinel, sergent d'armes of John II of France, and Alix Deschamps. She was the sister of Ferry Cassinel, bishop of Lodève and Auxerre and eventually archbishop of Rheims.

Biette was married to Gérard de Montagu by 1336. She was the mother of Jean de Montagu, who would rise to become Grand Master of France. It is said by some that Jean was her son by Charles V, while Merlet and Delachenal state there is no evidence for this. (Note: Merlet states that Charles V was 12 or 13 at the time of Jean's birth. "..concerning the relations which may have existed between Charles V and the mother of Jean de Montaigu, are not justified by any proof by any reference..") Autrand states that a clerk of Parlement skipped two words, concerning Jean's execution, which incorrectly attributed Charles V as Jean's father, instead of his legitimate father Gerard de Montaigu.

== Sources ==
- Autrand, Françoise (1994). Charles V, le Sage. Fayard.
- Adams, Tracy; Adams, Christine (2020). The Creation of the French Royal Mistress: From Agnès Sorel to Madame Du Barry. The Pennsylvania State University Press.
- Delachenal, Roland (1909). Histoire de Charles V. Vol. I. Picard.
- Merlet, Lucien (1852). "Biographie de Jean de Montagu, grand maître de France (1350-1409)". Bibliothèque de l'École des chartes. 13: 248-284. doi:10.3406/bec.1852.445064.
