= Guillaume IV de Melun =

French politician, chamberlain and advisor

Guillaume IV de Melun, Count of Tancarville, Lord of Montreuil-Bellay, was a French politician, chamberlain and advisor to King Charles VI of France. He was one of the marmousets who governed France between 1388 and 1392.

== Biography ==
Guillaume IV de Melun was the son of Jean II (Viscount) de Melun and Jeanne Crespin, married by contract signed on 4 September 1389 and celebrated on 21 January 1390 to Jeanne de Parthenay Larchevêque, who gave him a child named Marguerite de Melun, Viscountess of Tancarville.

In 1393 he was sent to England to establish a peace treaty until the recovery of King Charles VI's health. In 1396 he went to Italy to take possession of the Republic of Genoa, which had been given to the king. He went to Florence and Cyprus to enter into treaties of alliance. On his return to France he was appointed Grand Butler of France and the first president of the Court of Accounts on 29 April 1402. Guillaume IV de Melun was also employed in many other important occasions and killed at the Battle of Agincourt on 25 October 1415.
