= Pierre Aycelin de Montaigut =

French cardinal

Pierre Aycelin de Montaigut Cardinal de Laon
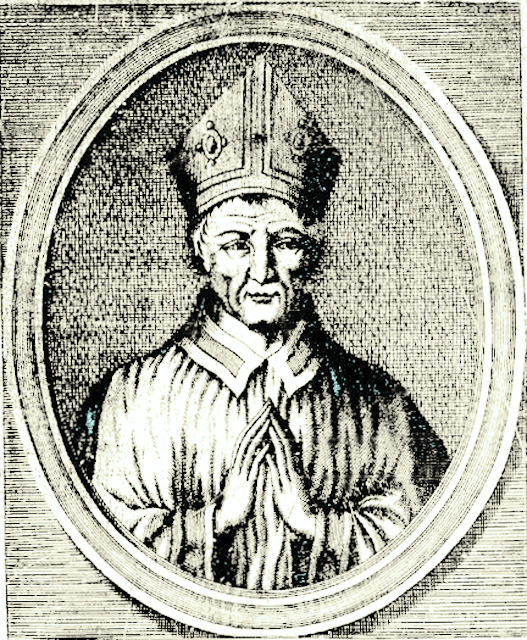
- Cardinal Pierre Aycelin de Montaigu
- Born: Auvergne
- Died: Avignon
- Cause of death: Poisoned
- Resting place: 48.8669°N 2.3546°E
- Occupation: Cardinal

Pierre Aycelin de Montaigut or Montaigu, Montagu, known as Cardinal de Laon, born between 1320 and 1325 and died 8 November 1388, was a fourteenth-century French cardinal, who was the bishop of Nevers (1361–1371) and bishop of the Diocese of Laon (1371-1386), advisor to the king of Charles V and peer of France.

He took part in the Council of King Charles V, acting as regent during the minority of King Charles VI of France who ascended to the throne after his uncle's death. He was known then as one of the marmousets. His autopsy proved that he was poisoned on 8 November 1388, being buried in the abbey church of the priory of Saint-Martin-des-Champs in Paris.

== Biography ==
=== Family ===
Pierre Aycelin de Montaigut descended from a family of minor nobility originally from Auvergne who owned land near Billom, acquired in 1295 by the house of Aycelin. The last representative, who also owned the manor of Châteldon (Puy Dome), died in 1427. The coat-of-arms of this house was of sand, three golden torn Lyon langued gules.

Brother of Cardinal Gilles Aycelin de Montaigu, (Note: Both were nephews of Gilles I Aycelin de Montaigu, archbishop of Narbonne and the archbishop of Rouen.) who was bishop of Thérouanne and Lord Chancellor of France between 1357-1358 and again in 1361. His mother Mascaronne de La Tour d'Auvergne was the aunt of Guy de La Tour d'Auvergne, Lord of Olliergues, who married Martha Roger de Beaufort. She was the niece of Pope Clement VI, and his brother was Pope Gregory XI.

=== Religious ===
Like his uncle, Pierre Aycelin Montaigut was a doctor of canon law. He was a Benedictine monk and prior of the abbey of Saint-Martin des Champs. In 1359 he became chancellor to Jean de Berry, son of the King of France Jean II, le Bon. In 1361 he was appointed bishop of Nevers, succeeding Renaud II de Moulins. In 1368 he became ambassador to King Charles V with Pope Urban V. On 8 January 1371 he was promoted to bishop-duke of Laon by Pope Gregory XI.

In 1379 he played a role in the support given by France to the antipope Clement VII. In 1383 he tried to bring the county of Flanders, under the authority of the papacy, to Avignon. Pierre Aycelin Montaigut was created a cardinal by Pope Clement VII of the Avignon Obedience in the Consistory of 23 December 1383. In 1385, he gave up his position as bishop of Laon. On 15 January 1388 the abbot of Saint-Denis, Guy de Monceau, accept the arbitration of the cardinal of Laon in the proceedings against the bishop of Paris, locked in the prison of the abbey.

On 1 November 1388 Charles VI attended the All Saints' Day mass in Reims. He stopped in Champagne after returning from an expedition against the Duke of Guelders, an ally of the English. On 3 November a large meeting of the council was held in the episcopal palace of Reims. The cardinal of Laon, Peirre Aycelin Montaigut, former advisor to Charles V, was the one to take the matter to the table. After him, the archbishop of Reims and his warlords decided that the young ruler was capable of governing France.
