= Gui de Ceriz =

Grand Master of France

Gui de Ceriz (+ap.1369), Lord of Ceriz was a French aristocrat who served as Great Master of France (1343. Heraldics)

De Ceriz supervised the Royal House of the King of France. His heraldic shield contained two red sceptres with a royal crown on top
