= Grand Master of France =

Position in the royal household of the King of France

Ornaments of the Grand Master

The Grand Master of France (French: Grand Maître de France) was, during the Ancien Régime and Bourbon Restoration in France, one of the Great Officers of the Crown of France and head of the "Maison du Roi", the king's royal household. The position is similar to that of Lord Steward in England.

== History ==
The original name of the office was Sovereign Master of the Hotel of the King (French: Souverain Maître d'hôtel du Roi'), until 1380, then becoming Grand Master of the Hotel of the King (French: Grand Maître d'hôtel du Roi), until 1463, before finally becoming Grand Master of France. The symbol of the Grand Master was a blue baton charged with golden fleur-de-lis, similar to the royal coat of arms of France, capped with a golden representation of the French royal crown. The Grand Master was entitled to bear this symbol of his office in his coat of arms, two being crossed in saltire behind the shield.

== Duties ==
The position was a successor to the earlier positions of Mayor of the Palace and Seneschal of France. One of the highest posts in the French court, the "Grand maître" directed the Maison du Roi, appointed new officers to the "Maison" (who would swear an oath of service in his hands) and managed the budget of the "Maison". He was also responsible for policing the court and he managed the king's lands (which made him a sort of Minister of the Interior). In practice however, the military branch of the Maison du Roi was frequently run by the Constable of France or the Secretary of State for War.

He had numerous ceremonial duties. At the death of the king he would lead the funeral procession and, at the king's tomb, he would break his baton, throw it into the tomb and intone "Gentlemen, the King is dead; you are free from his service"; he would then take a new baton and intone "Gentlemen, the King lives, and gives you your posts."

In the Early Modern period, most of the real work of the Grand maître was accomplished by his secretaries, and not by himself personally. His role was thus generally symbolic, although he often took personal charge of his ceremonial duties. Furthermore, with the creation of the Secretary of State of the Maison du Roi in the 16th century, the Grand maître was forced to share some of his duties: in general the Secretary's oversight was purely formal, as the officers of the "Maison du Roi" were under the direct authority of the Grand Maître of France; yet, the "Secrétaire d'État à la Maison du Roi" was in charge of recruiting officers for the "Maison du Roi", and would receive prospective applications for posts and submit them to the king for his approval.

== Officeholders ==
The position was frequently given to the highest of the nobility or to the king's close friends. Francis I conferred it upon his former teacher Artus Gouffier, then to his uncle René de Savoie, the "grand bâtard de Savoie", then to his friend Anne, duc de Montmorency.

In 1559, with the dismissal of Montmorency, the office fell into the hands of the Dukes of Guise, who used the position to increase their influence at court to such a point that Henry III forced Henry I, Duke of Guise to reduce his scope of authority. In 1594, the position passed into the control of the House of Bourbon and the Princes of Condé, who maintained control until the French Revolution (except for the period 1654–1656, when it was held by Thomas of Savoy-Carignano, who had replaced the Guises as foremost of the princes étrangers).

== Grand Masters of France ==
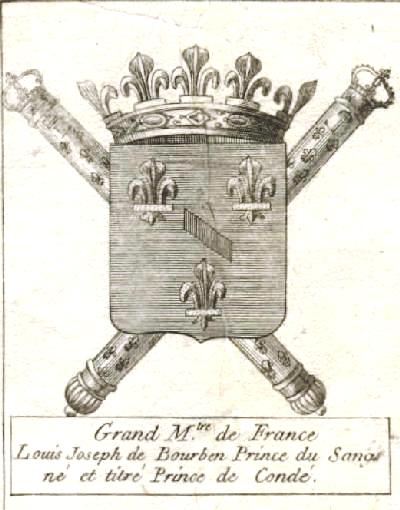
Coat of arms of Louis Joseph, Prince of Condé, the last Grand Maître de France

- ca. 1300: Arnould de Wesemal
- 1310: Mathieu II de Trie
- 1321: Jean de Beaumont (died c. 1344)
- 1343: Gui de Ceriz (died 1369)
- 1347: Robert III de Dreux (1288–1351)
- ca. 1350: Jean II de Châtillon (died 1363)
- ca. 1350: Jean II de Melun (died 1381)
- ca. 1350: Pierre I de Villiers (died c. 1390)
- ca. 1350: Gui IV Damas (1288–1351)
- ca. 1380: Jean Le Mercier (died 1397)
- 1388–1408: Jean de Montagu (died 1409)
- 1408–1409: Louis VII, Duke of Bavaria (ca. 1368–1447)
- 1409–1413: Guichard II Dauphin (died 1415)
- 1413–1422: Louis, Count of Vendôme (1376–1446)
- 1422–1440: Tanguy du Chastel (died 1449)
- 1440–1451: Charles de Culant (died c. 1451)
- 1451–1453: Jacques de Chabannes (died 1453)
- 1456–1461: Raoul de Gaucourt (died 1461)
- 1463: Antoine I de Croÿ (1385–1475)
- 1465–1467: Charles Ier de Melun (executed on 22 August 1468)
- 1467: Antoine de Chabannes (1408–1488)
- ca. 1483: François Guy XV, comte de Laval et Monfort (1435–1500)
- 1485–ca. 1496 : Philip II, Duke of Savoy (1438–1497)
- 1502–1511: Charles II d'Amboise (1473–1511)
- 1511–1515: Jacques II de Chabannes-La Palice (ca.1470–1525)
- 1515–1519: Artus Gouffier, duc de Roannais (died 1519)
- 1519–1525: René of Savoy, comte de Villars (died 1525)
- 1526–1558: Anne de Montmorency (1492–1567)
- 1558–1559: François de Montmorency (died 1579)
- 1559–1563: François of Lorraine, duc de Guise (1520–1563)
- 1563–1588: Henry I, Duke of Guise (1550–1588)
- 1588–1594: Charles, Duke of Guise (1571–1640)
- 1594–1612: Charles de Bourbon, comte de Soissons (1566–1612)
- 1612–1641: Louis de Bourbon, comte de Soissons (1604–1641)
- 1643–1646: Henry II de Bourbon, prince de Condé (1588–1646)
- 1647–1654(?): Louis II de Bourbon, prince de Condé, le Grand Condé (1621–1686)
- 1654–1656: Thomas of Savoy, prince of Carignano (1596–1656)
- 1656–1660: Armand de Bourbon, prince de Conti (1629–1666)
- 1660–1685: Henri Jules de Bourbon, prince de Condé (1643–1709)
- 1685–1710: Louis III, prince de Condé (1668–1710)
- 1710–1740: Louis Henri, duc de Bourbon, prince de Condé (1692–1740)
- 1740–1790 and 1814–1818: Louis Joseph de Bourbon, prince de Condé (1736–1818)
