= Jean Courtecuisse =

French bishop and theologian

Jean Courtecuisse (c.1350, Le Mans - 4 March 1423, Geneva) was a French bishop and theologian, who was elected bishop of Paris and bishop of Geneva.

== Life ==
He received a doctorate in theology and taught it in Paris. He was king's almoner from 1408 onwards and served as chancellor in Jean de Gerson's absence. In 1409 he became a canon of Notre Dame Cathedral. He was elected bishop of Paris in 1420 but was forced to leave the bishopric and hide at abbaye de Saint-Germain-des-Prés after displeasing Henry V of England, then master of the city. In 1422-23 he was transferred to the bishopric of Geneva, which he held until his death.

Courtecuisse was a prolific writer, leaving sermons in Latin and French, several theological works and a treatise entitled On Faith and the Church (Tractatus de fide et Ecclesia, Romano pontifice et concilii generali). The Bibliothèque de Genève has a manuscript translation by him of Formula vitæ honestæ; De quattuor virtutibus by Martin of Braga, entitled Le livre Senecque des quatre vertus cardinalz.

== Sources ==
- A. P. J. Pictet de Sergy, Genève, origine et développement de cette république, Tome second, Ch. Gruaz, Genève, 1849.
