= Jean de La Grange =

French Catholic cardinal

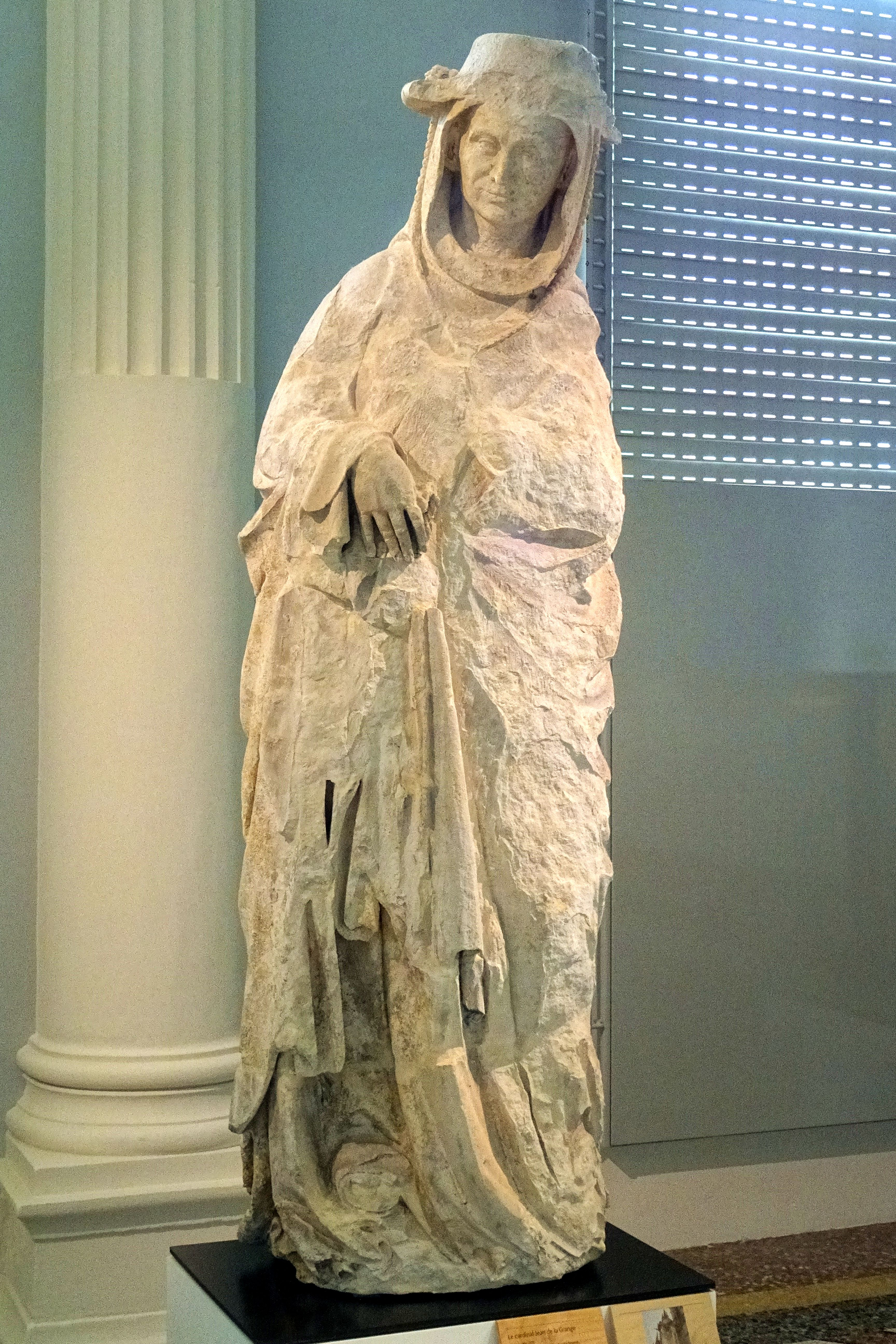
Statue of La Grange from the exterior of Amiens Cathedral

Jean de La Grange (a.k.a. Jean de Lagrange; c.1325 – April 25, 1402) was a French prelate and politician, active during the reigns of Charles V and Charles VI, and an important member of the papal curia at Avignon, at the time of the Western Schism. He was the brother of Étienne de La Grange, an advisor to the king and president of Parlement.

== Biography ==
A Benedictine monk, he was successively Prior of Élancourt, then of Gigny, and ultimately procurator of the Cluniac Order. He became abbot of Fécamp in 1358 and joined the Council of King Charles V after having been in the entourage of Charles the Bad. Within the Council, he was in charge of ecclesiastical affairs but also was involved in financial and fiscal issues. In 1370, the king named him president of the Cour des Aides. He was named bishop of Amiens (1373), then cardinal-bishop with the title of Saint-Marcel (1375).

La Grange became a counsellor of Gregory XI (c 1336-78), the French-born pope who ended the period during which the papacy was located in Avignon, France (the so-called Babylonian Captivity) by returning to Rome in 1376. When Gregory died the following year, however, La Grange arrived in Rome too late to take part in the Conclave that elected his successor, Pope Urban VI, an Italian. In protest at the election of a non-French pope, La Grange joined other French Cardinals in re-convening the Conclave in Fondi and elected a rival pope, Clement VII, the first of the so-called Antipopes.

He then convinced Charles V to support the new pope. In 1394 he was named cardinal-bishop of Frascati. He was then cast aside by Pope Benedict XIII, successor to Clement VII, who then lost the French support from which his predecessor had benefitted. He then joined the party of those calling for his abdication and organizing the withdrawal of obedience of 1398. Jean de La Grange thus entered into conflict with Louis of Orléans, but died before the end of the process.

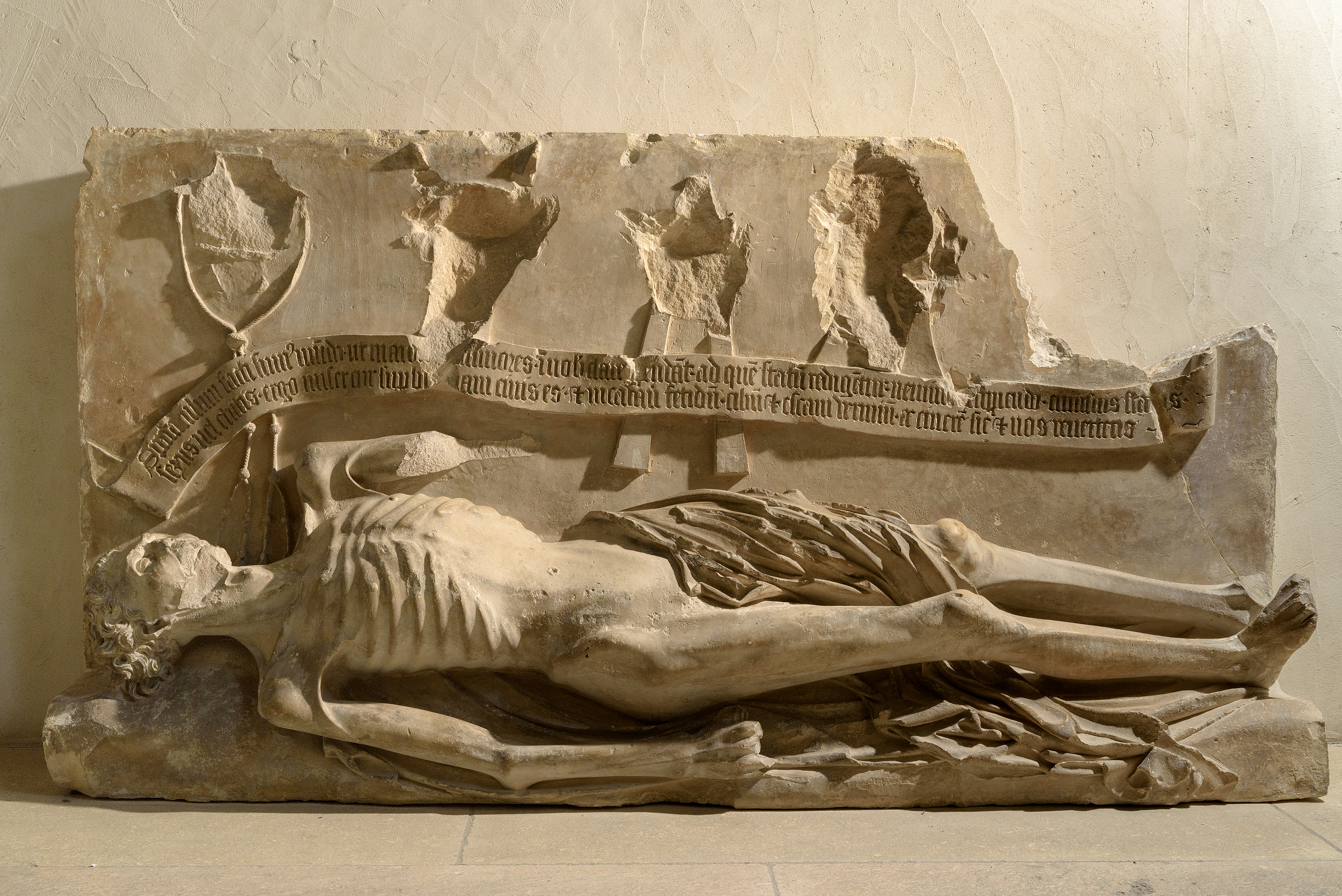
Surviving base of his monumental tomb at Avignon

In his will, he desired to have two gravesites: one to have his flesh, and to be kept in Avignon; and the other to have his bones, put into a casket at Amiens Cathedral. Two sites are identified as his tomb: a monument in Amiens Cathedral, and a monument in Avignon, which is an early example of a transi or cadaver tomb.
