= Jean de Montagu =

Royal secretary of Charles V of France

Jean de Montagu or Jean de Montaigu (c.1363, Paris – Paris, 17 October 1409), was a royal secretary to King Charles V, and subsequently an administrator and advisor to King Charles VI of France, who became a leading figure in France during the early 15th Century.

== Biography ==
Jean was born in 1363 the son of Gerard de Montagu and Biette de Cassinel, called la belle Italienne ("the beautiful Italian woman"). She was the daughter of François Cassinel (died 1360), a sergeant in the Royal Army, and great-granddaughter of Bettino Cassinelli, who had immigrated from Italy to Paris. Jean de Montagu had two brothers: Gérard de Montagu the Younger (died 1420), who was bishop of Poitiers and bishop of Paris; and Jean de Montagu (killed 25 October 1415 at the Battle of Agincourt), who was bishop of Chartres, and archbishop of Sens. (Note: One brother, Gérard, was chancellor to the Duke of Berry, Bishop of Poitiers and then of Paris; the other, Jean, was Bishop of Chartres, then Chancellor of France and Archbishop of Sens.)

Jean made a career at the royal court of Charles VI of France, rising to become Grand Treasurer and Grand Master of France. Through the income derived from his various offices granted to him through the favor of the king, he acquired an immense fortune, and in 1389, Jean bought the lands of Boissy-sous-Saint-Yon and Égly for twelve hundred pounds, and subsequently inherited and acquired several more estates, including the valuable Château de Montagu.

Being the leading figure of the royal government during the period following the assassination of Louis, the Duke of Orléans, in the ongoing Armagnac-Burgundian Civil War, Jean developed a very bitter rivalry with the Duke of Burgundy, John the Fearless, who sought to hold the Regency (and the income of the Royal Household) in place of the mentally incapable King Charles VI, as his father had done.

In 1409, John the Fearless had Jean arrested with the help of the Provost of Paris during one of King Charles' mad spells. The Queen and the Duke of Berry, among several others, pleaded for his release to no avail. After an expedited summary trial where he unsuccessfully appealed to the then Burgundian-controlled Parliament a forced confession of treason and other charges upon being subjected to torture, Montagu was beheaded on 17 October 1409 in front of a large crowd in Paris, at the Gibbet of Montfaucon.

Jean's name was rehabilitated several years later, obtained by his son Charles, and his remains were interred in a lavishly built tomb at the Monastery of the Celestines of Marcoussis, which Jean de Montagu had greatly expanded between 1402 and 1408.

== Children ==
Jean married Jacqueline de La Grange, c. 1380, daughter of Étienne de La Grange, President of the Parlement of Paris, and Marie Dubois. They had:

- Charles (killed 25 October 1415, at the Battle of Agincourt), married Catherine d'Albret, daughter of Charles I d'Albret, Constable of France.
- Bonne-Elisabeth, married John VI, Count of Roucy (also killed 25 October 1415, at the Battle of Agincourt) and had issue, later married Pierre de Bourbon-Préaux.
- Jacqueline, married firstly John of Craon, Viscount of Châteaudun, then John Malet de Graville and had issue.
- Joan (died September 1420, Valère-en-Touraine), married to Jacques II de Bourbon-Préaulx (1391 – 19 October 1429, Piacenza), brother of the above.

== See also ==
- The marmousets, a group of counsellors to Charles VI

== Sources ==
- Autrand, Françoise (1994). Charles V, le Sage. Fayard.
- Autrand, Françoise (1995). "La Priere de Charles V". Annuaire-Bulletin de la Société de l'histoire de France (in French). Editions de Boccard: 37–68. ISBN 978-1-85285-522-2.
- Chattaway, Carol Mary (2006). The Order of the Golden Tree: The Gift-giving Objectives of Duke Philip the Bold of Burgundy. Isd.
- Knecht, Robert (2007). The Valois: Kings of France 1328–1589. A&C Black.
- Merlet, Lucien (1852). "Biographie de Jean de Montagu, grand maître de France (1350–1409)". Bibliothèque de l'École des chartes (in French). 13: 248–284. doi:10.3406/bec.1852.445064.
