= Counsel =

Legal professional title in English-speaking countries

A counsel or a counsellor at law is a person who gives advice and deals with various issues, particularly in legal matters. It is a title often used interchangeably with the title of lawyer.

The word counsel can also mean advice given outside of the context of the legal profession.

== UK and Ireland ==
The legal system in England uses the term counsel as an approximate synonym for a barrister-at-law, but not for a solicitor, and may apply it to mean either a single person who pleads a cause, or collectively, the body of barristers engaged in a case.

The difference between "Barrister" and "Counsel" is subtle. In England and Wales, "Barrister" is a professional title awarded by one of the four Inns of Court, and is used in a barrister's private, academic or professional capacity. "Counsel" is used to refer to a barrister who is instructed on a particular case. It is customary to use the third person when addressing a barrister instructed on a case: "Counsel is asked to advise" rather than "You are asked to advise". However, it is considered inappropriate to address an individual barrister verbally as 'counsel'. The correct form is to call the barrister 'Mr X' or 'Miss Y' but never 'Counsel'.

The legal term counsellor, or more fully, counsellor-at-law, became practically obsolete in England, but continued in use locally in Ireland, as an equivalent to barrister, where a Senior Counsel (S.C.) is equivalent to the UK King's Counsel (K.C.)

After they have graduated from University with a law degree, they become a 'junior counsel', their work normally is completing most of the paperwork in cases (such as drafting legal documents). After about 10 to 15 years of practising as a junior counsel, a barrister may apply to become a senior counsel. This is sometimes called "taking silk" this because the senior counsel's gown was traditionally made of silk. A senior counsel may have the letters SC after his/her name.

== North America ==
In the United States of America, the term counselor-at-law designates, specifically, an attorney admitted to practice in all courts of law; but as the United States legal system makes no formal division of the legal profession into two classes, as in the United Kingdom, most US citizens use the term loosely in the same sense as lawyer, meaning one who is versed in (or practicing) law.

In the United States and Canada, many large and midsize law firms have lawyers with the job title of "counsel", "special counsel" or "of counsel". These lawyers are employees of the firm like associates, although some firms have an independent contractor relationship with them. But unlike associates, and more like partners, they generally have their own clients, manage their own files, and may supervise associates.

== Non-legal usage ==
The word "counsel" also means advice given by a professional (psychology and social sciences, religious, academic, etc.) regarding the judgment or conduct of another.

== See also ==
- Attorney at law
- General counsel
- Ineffective assistance of counsel
