= Charles Louis François de Paule de Barentin =

French magistrate and statesman

Charles-Louis-François de Paule de Barentin

Keeper of the Seals of France
- In office 17 September 1788 – 3 August 1789
- Preceded by: Chrétien François de Lamoignon de Bâville
- Succeeded by: Jérôme Champion de Cicé

Personal details
- Born: July 1, 1738 Paris, Kingdom of France
- Died: May 30, 1819 (aged 80) Paris, France
- Resting place: Père Lachaise Cemetery
- Spouse: Anne-Albertine-Antoinette Masson de Meslay
- Relatives: Charles Dambray (son-in-law)
- Profession: Magistrate, Statesman
- Awards: Order of the Holy Spirit, Order of Saint Michael

Charles-Louis-François de Paule de Barentin (1 July 1738 – 30 May 1819) was a French magistrate and statesman who served as Keeper of the Seals of France during the final years of the reign of Louis XVI.

He was noted by contemporaries for his stern sense of justice and his dedication to the restoration of order within the judicial system.

== Early life and career ==
Charles-Louis-François de Paule de Barentin was born into the Barentin family, a notable family of the noblesse de robe. He was the son of Charles Amable Honoré Barentin (1703–1762), who served as a conseiller in the Parlement of Paris, and Marie Catherine Lefèvre d'Ormesson. In 1757, he became a counselor and by 1764 served as advocate-general to the Parlement of Paris, a position in which he distinguished himself by his talents.

Barentin served as a conseiller and later as an avocat général at the Parlement of Paris (1757–1775), followed by a tenure as president of the Cour des Aides (1775–1788). He succeeded Malesherbes in this role and was credited with restoring regularity to the tribunal, which had been disturbed under his predecessor.

In 1764, he was presented at Court, and his wife was presented in 1788. It was reported that Louis XVI, having been acquainted with Barentin's conduct on the bench through Miromesnil, conceived a highly favorable opinion of his merits.

In 1770, he sold the estate and the Château des Belles Ruries, located near Tours, which had been in his family since the end of the 16th century.

In 1787, Barentin supported Charles-Alexandre de Calonne in his financial restoration projects during the Assembly of Notables. Following this, he succeeded Lamoignon as Keeper of the Seals, whose attempts to reform the parlements were seen as visionary yet controversial. He held a low opinion of Jacques Necker and opposed him on the issue of doubling the Third Estate representation. This opposition, coupled with his advice to the King, made him a subject of popular hatred; he was publicly denounced by Mirabeau for allegedly giving "evil counsel" to the sovereign.

Three months after the first riots of the Journée des Tuiles, on 14 September 1788, he was appointed Keeper of the Seals of France. In this position, he upheld voting freedom and opposed the automatic appointment of certain high-ranking figures as deputies. In May 1789, he was appointed Chancellor and Superintendent of the King's Finances.

In May 1789, he was also appointed Chancellor and Superintendent of the King's Finances, though he resigned from this position in July 1789.

== During the Revolution ==
At the opening of the Estates General on 5 May 1789, Barentin delivered a reply in the name of the King to the address of the commons, praying for the removal of the troops. After the King had concluded his speech, Barentin urged the deputies to reject "dangerous innovations" which the enemies of the public good might confuse with the necessary and happy changes required to bring about the "regeneration"—the primary wish of His Majesty.

Falsely judged to be the main person responsible for the dismissal of Jacques Necker, Barentin was dismissed by the King on 15 July 1789. The King initially hesitated to permit his resignation, but eventually consented, conveying his permission in an affecting letter expressive of the high sense he entertained of Barentin's services. He retired in the first instance to the Château de Meslay, near Chartres. However, his enemies reported that the Queen was in league with him and concealed in the castle, which placed his life in danger and forced him to seek another asylum.

In November 1789, he was accused of the crime of lèse-nation, specifically for having orchestrated a plot against the capital. The formal charge was brought on 18 November 1789 before the Comité de Recherches de la Ville de Paris for allegedly conspiring to bring troops to the city to overawe its citizens. The Châtelet court acquitted him on 1 March 1790, which led some Parisians to remark that the jurisdiction was "the Queen's laundry" (la buanderie de la reine).

Shortly thereafter, he emigrated to Italy. In 1791, Barentin returned to France to participate in the Flight to Varennes, during which he waited for Louis XVI at Montmédy. The King, however, did not get past Varennes. Barentin subsequently left France again; after residing for some time in Piedmont and Germany, he spent the greater part of his emigration in England, where he remained until 1814.

During his absence, his Picardy estates at Hardivillers—where he had rebuilt the château in the 1780s—and Maisoncelle-Tuilerie were sold as biens nationaux and partitioned. The Hardivillers château, barely completed, was destroyed.

== Under the Restoration ==
Upon the return of Louis XVIII, Barentin followed the sovereign. Because his advanced age prevented him from reassuming his original office as Keeper of the Seals, the position was conferred upon his son-in-law, Charles Dambray. Barentin himself was named an honorary Chancellor of France and a Commander of the Order of the Holy Spirit.

He died in Paris on 30 May 1819 and was buried in the Saint-Sulpice cemetery in Vaugirard, before being transferred to the Père Lachaise Cemetery.

== Marriage and issue ==
He married Anne-Albertine-Antoinette Masson de Meslay (1744–1796) by contract signed on 15 May 1763 before Delaleu, a notary in Paris. The contract was signed the same day at the Marly by the King and the Royal Family. She was the daughter of Antoine Lambert Masson de Meslay, president of the Chambre des comptes de Paris, and Michelle Pétronille Mérault. She was the sister of Jérôme-Pélagie Masson de Meslay, who died without issue, from whom Barentin inherited the Meslay-le-Vidame. They had one daughter:

- Marie Charlotte Antoinette de Barentin (1765–1802), who married Charles Dambray (1760–1829), Chancellor of France, president of the Chamber of Peers, in 1782. They had issue.

== Bibliography ==
- Rose, Hugh James (1848). A New General Biographical Dictionary. Vol. 3. London: B. Fellowes.
- Granges de Surgères, Marquis de (1895). 2500 Actes de l'état civil ou notariés concernant les familles de l'ancienne France. Nantes: l'auteur.
- Bluche, François (1956). L'Origine des Magistrats du Parlement de Paris au XVIIIe siècle. Vol. V–VI. Paris: Mémoires de la Fédération des Sociétés historiques et archéologiques de Paris et de l'Ile de France. ASIN 2908003252.
- Prevost, M. (1951). Dictionnaire de Biographie Française. Vol. 5. Paris: Letouzey & Ané.
- Carré de Busserolle, Jacques-Xavier (1878). Dictionnaire géographique, historique et biographique d'Indre et Loire et de l'ancienne province de Touraine. Vol. 1. Tours: Rouillé-Ladevèze.
- Bluche, François (1957). Les Honneurs de la Cour. Les Cahiers Nobles n° 10. Paris: Les Cahiers Nobles.
- Granges de Surgères, Marquis de (1902). Répertoire Historique et Biographique de la Gazette de France. Vol. 1. Paris: Librairie Henri Leclerc. ASIN 2329980566.
- Barentin, Charles-Louis-François de Paule (1844). Champion, Maurice (ed.). Mémoire autographe de M. de Barentin, chancelier et garde des sceaux, sur les derniers conseils du roi Louis XVI. Paris.
- Tulard, Jean; Fayard, Jean-François; Fierro, Alfred (1998). Histoire et dictionnaire de la Révolution française. 1789-1799. Paris: Robert Laffont. ISBN 978-2-221-08850-0.
