= Jérôme Champion de Cicé =

Jérôme Marie Champion de Cicé
- Archbishop of Bordeaux, then Aix
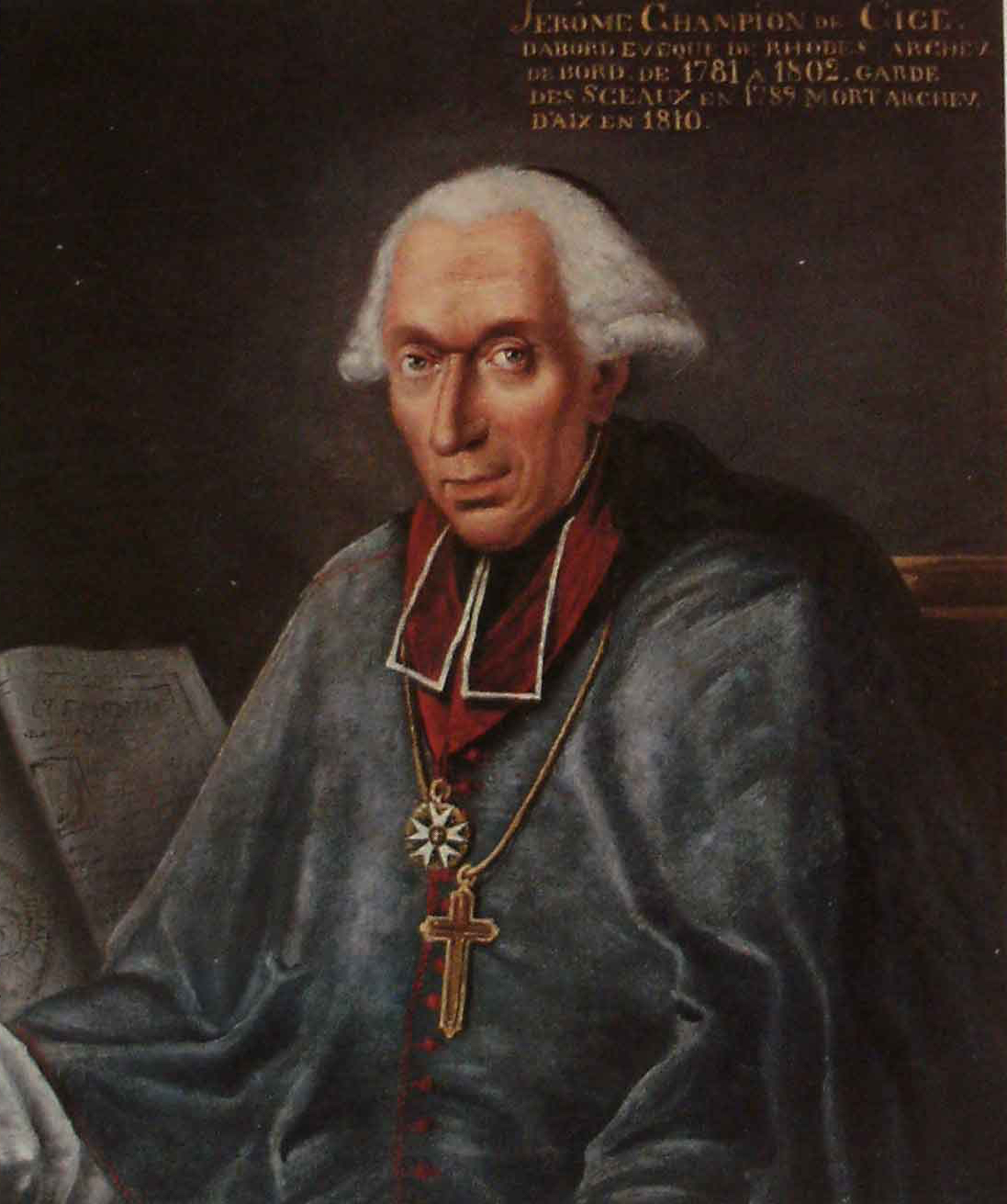
- Previous posts: Bishop of Rodez (1770–1781); Archbishop of Bordeaux (1781–1801); Archbishop of Aix-en-Provence (1802–1810)

Orders
- Ordination: 1761
- Consecration: 26 August 1770

Personal details
- Born: 3 September 1735 Rennes, France
- Died: 19 August 1810 (aged 74) Aix-en-Provence, France
- Motto: Soli Deo
- Coat of arms: Jérôme Marie Champion de Cicé's coat of arms

Jérôme Marie Champion de Cicé (born 3 September 1735 in Rennes – died 19 August 1810 in Aix-en-Provence.) was a French churchman and politician of the 18th century.

Jérôme Champion de Cicé, Archbishop of Bordeaux, was one of the four prelates who had headed the majority of the clergy estate in their union with the Third Estate (tiers état). Appointed Keeper of the Seals by Louis XVI in succession to Barentin, he was the author of a draft declaration of rights in 24 articles that served as the basis for the Declaration of the Rights of Man and of the Citizen of 1789 and is considered one of its "fathers".

== Biography ==
Born in Rennes on 3 September 1735, Jérôme Champion de Cicé studied at the Collège du Plessis, where his fellow pupils included Boisgelin de Cucé, Loménie de Brienne, Morellet and Turgot. In 1763, he became a Doctor of Theology at the Sorbonne. He was the grand-nephew of Louis Armand Champion de Cicé, a missionary in Canada, China and later Siam, where he served as apostolic vicar and bishop in partibus infidelium of Sabule from 1701 to 1727.

As early as 1760, he was appointed commendatory abbot of Chantemerle Abbey, which provided him with an annual income of 2,000 to 2,500 livres. Ordained a priest in 1761, he became vicar general in Auxerre, where his elder brother Jean-Baptiste-Marie Champion de Cicé had just been appointed bishop.

From 1765 to 1770, he served as Agent-General of the Clergy of France and Councillor of State. In 1770, he struck up a friendship with Turgot and, together with César-Guillaume de La Luzerne (his colleague at the agency, later Bishop of Langres), published the Rapports de l'agence, contenant les principales affaires du clergé, qui se sont passées depuis l'année 1765 jusqu'en l'année 1770, in which he recounted his experience as an agent of the clergy.

He was appointed Bishop of Rodez in 1770. In 1771, he launched a large-scale survey throughout his diocese by means of a printed questionnaire sent to all parish priests. Most of the questions concerned the state of the population, its means of subsistence, the economy, health – only one dealt with spiritual matters. In 1776, he published the Procès verbal de l'Assemblée générale du clergé de France tenue à Paris en 1770, a substantial volume of 868 pages. In 1779, the provincial administration of Haute-Guyenne (covering Quercy and Rouergue) was created within the généralité of Montauban, and Champion de Cicé was appointed its president. In this capacity, he oversaw the modernisation of the land registry with a view to reassessing taxes.

Appointed Archbishop of Bordeaux in 1781, he helped to found the National Institute for the Deaf (INJS) of Bordeaux in 1786.

On 14 February 1789, he published a Mandement prescrivant des prières pour le succès des États généraux (Mandate prescribing prayers for the success of the Estates-General), which greatly displeased the nobility.

Elected – like his elder brother Jean-Baptiste-Marie, Bishop of Auxerre – as a deputy of the clergy to the Estates-General of 1789, he was tasked with presenting the work of the Committee on the Constitution, including the text of the Declaration of the Rights of Man and of the Citizen of 1789.

In the aftermath of the Night of 4 August, Jérôme Champion de Cicé was appointed Keeper of the Seals by Louis XVI. Just three days after his appointment, on 7 August 1789, he went to the National Assembly with seven other ministers, sent by the king "who wishes to be one with his nation" to ask how to restore order. Necker then spoke about the state of finances.

Thereafter, he addressed the Assembly only as Keeper of the Seals, in order to maintain, as far as possible, the link between the king and the deputies. On 21 November 1790, after the proclamation of the Civil Constitution of the Clergy, he resigned his office as Keeper of the Seals and decided to resume his duties as a deputy. Having requested leave to rest, he was not present during the debate on the oath and did not take it.

His name having been placed on the list of absentees (18 July 1791), he emigrated, first to Brussels, then to the Netherlands. From 1795 to 1802, he settled in London, where he found fellow monarchists such as Malouët and Lally-Tollendal, as well as liberal prelates like Boisgelin and Fontanges.

On 8 October 1801, he published a 15-page document in London entitled Lettre de Mgr l'archevêque de Bordeaux à ses diocésains (Letter from the Archbishop of Bordeaux to his diocesans), in which he explained to them the reasons for his resignation, submitted at the request of the Pope.

On 21 February 1802, he returned to France, and was almost immediately (on 9 April 1802) appointed Archbishop of Aix-en-Provence, a diocese that then encompassed both Bouches-du-Rhône and Var.

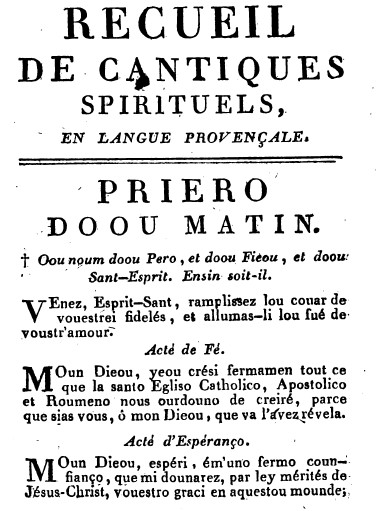
First page of Champion de Cicé's bilingual French/Provençal edition of Cantiques spirituels (Spiritual Canticles).

Jérôme Champion de Cicé was sensitive to the issue of regional languages and published Catechisms in the local idiom in the various dioceses he administered.

On 15 January 1805, Jérôme Champion de Cicé was raised to the rank of Officer of the National Order of the Legion of Honour. Three years later, on 16 September 1808, he was made a Count of the Empire by Napoleon.

He died of illness in Aix-en-Provence at the archiepiscopal palace on 19 August 1810.

== The Declaration of the Rights of Man and of the Citizen of 1789 ==
The idea of a declaration of rights was borrowed from America; the rapporteur of the Constitution Committee appointed on 14 July 1789, Jérôme Champion de Cicé, expressly acknowledged this in the report he presented on 27 July: "This noble idea conceived in another hemisphere was bound to be transplanted first among us. We contributed to the events that restored freedom to North America: she shows us on what principles we must base the preservation of our own; and it is the New World, to which we once brought only chains, that now teaches us how to avoid the misfortune of wearing them ourselves."

Around fifteen draft Declarations were successively presented to the Assembly during the summer of 1789 (drafts by La Fayette, Target, Mounier, Mirabeau, Sieyès, Gouges-Cartou, etc.). On 19 August, the Assembly gave priority to the one entitled "Draft Declaration of the Rights of Man and of the Citizen, discussed in the sixth bureau", chaired by Champion de Cicé. It was certainly for its balance that the draft reported by Champion de Cicé was chosen by the deputies to serve as the basis for the Declaration. The moderation of the Archbishop of Bordeaux and his art of consensus won over the deputies. Furthermore, the sixth bureau's draft meant that they did not have to choose between the drafts of the leading figures of the day, La Fayette, Sieyès or Mirabeau.

The draft reported by Champion de Cicé initially had 24 articles. From 20 August to 26 August 1789, the Assembly debated and amended the draft, article by article. On 26 August 1789, the Assembly adopted the 17 articles of the Declaration of the Rights of Man and of the Citizen. Articles 12 to 16 came directly from the sixth bureau's draft.

== Bibliography ==
- Mille, J. (1883). Notre métropole, ou monographie de Saint-Sauveur (in French). A. Makaire.
- Kerviler, René Pocard du Cosquer de (1886). Répertoire général de bio-bibliographie bretonne (in French). Vol. 3. J. Plihon et L. Hervé.
- Revue de Bretagne de Vendée & d'Anjou (in French). Vol. 17. O. de Gourcuff. 1897.
- Stephens, Henry Morse (1886). A History of the French Revolution. Vol. 1. C. Scribner's Sons.
- Talleyrand-Périgord, Charles Maurice de (1891). Memoirs of the Prince of Talleyrand. Vol. 1. Putnam. ISBN 9780598798725.
- Arp, Robert, ed. (2013). 1001 Ideas That Changed the Way We Think. Atria Books. ISBN 978-1476705729.
- Avril, Jean-Loup, ed. (1989). "Champion de Cicé, Jérôme-Marie". 500 bretons à connaître (in French). Saint-Malo: Éditions L'Ancre de marine. ISBN 2-905970-17-0.
- Cadilhon, François (1993). "Jérôme-Marie Champion de Cicé : vivre en archevêque à la fin du XVIIIe siècle". Revue d'histoire de l'Église de France (in French). 79 (202): 47–62. doi:10.3406/rhef.1993.1094.
