= Maupeou family =

French aristocratic family

Family de Maupeou
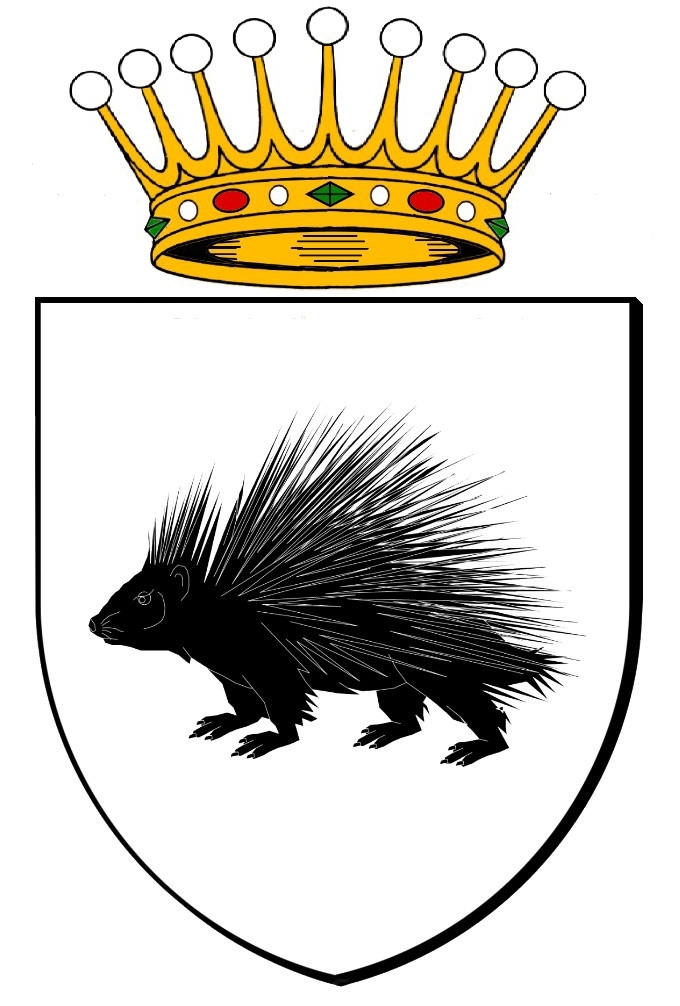
- Country: Kingdom of France
- Founded: 16th century
- Founder: Vincent Maupeou
- Titles: Lord Chancellor of France; Keeper of the Seals; Controller-General of Finances

The Maupeou family is a French aristocratic family from the Île-de-France, several representatives of which played a role as Controller-General of Finances or Chancellors in the history of the French monarchy.

== History ==
Vincent Maupeou, the founder of the House of Maupeou, was a civil law notary at the Châtelet of Paris in the middle of the 16th century. His three sons, Pierre, Michel and Gilles, were ennobled together by letters patent from King Henry III of France on 12 January 1587.

In 1692, Gilles-François de Maupeou inherited the town of Ableiges, which he developed and promoted to great success. In 1692, the hereditary title of Count of Ableiges was bestowed upon him by King Louis XIV.

The Maupeou family came to prominence with René Nicolas, Keeper of the Seals and last Lord Chancellor of the Ancien Régime, under the reign of Louis XV. In 1771, René Nicolas de Maupeou, then Chancellor since 1768, exiled 130 members of the Parlement in what amounted to a coup d'état to take back the judiciary, thus restoring Louis XV of France's authority over political reforms. At the time, the Dauphin, the future Louis XVI, approved the Chancellor's reforms despite a wave of hostility from the higher nobility and magistrates. Nonetheless, when Louis XVI acceded to the throne in 1774, he quickly dismissed Maupeou and the reforms he had implemented. In November of the same year, when the old parliaments were called back, he is claimed to have said: "If the king wants to lose his crown, he is master".

The Maupeou family has been granted the Honours of the Court in the 17th century.

== Branches ==
The house of Maupeou is divided in four main genealogical branches, two remain today :

- the Lords of Monceau, extinct,
- the Lords of Bruyères, remaining,
- the Lords of Sablonnières, extinct,
- and the Counts of Ableiges, remaining.

Vincent Maupeou (+ 1575)
Pierre I de Maupeou; Lord of Monceau and of Bruyères	Michel de Maupeou (+ 1590)	Gilles I de Maupeou; Lord of Ableiges
Pierre II de Maupeou; Lord of Monceau	René I de Maupeou; Lord of Bruyères
René II de Maupeou; Lord of Bruyères	Louis de Maupeou (1631 - 1669)
René de Maupeou; Lord of Sablonnières

== Notable members ==
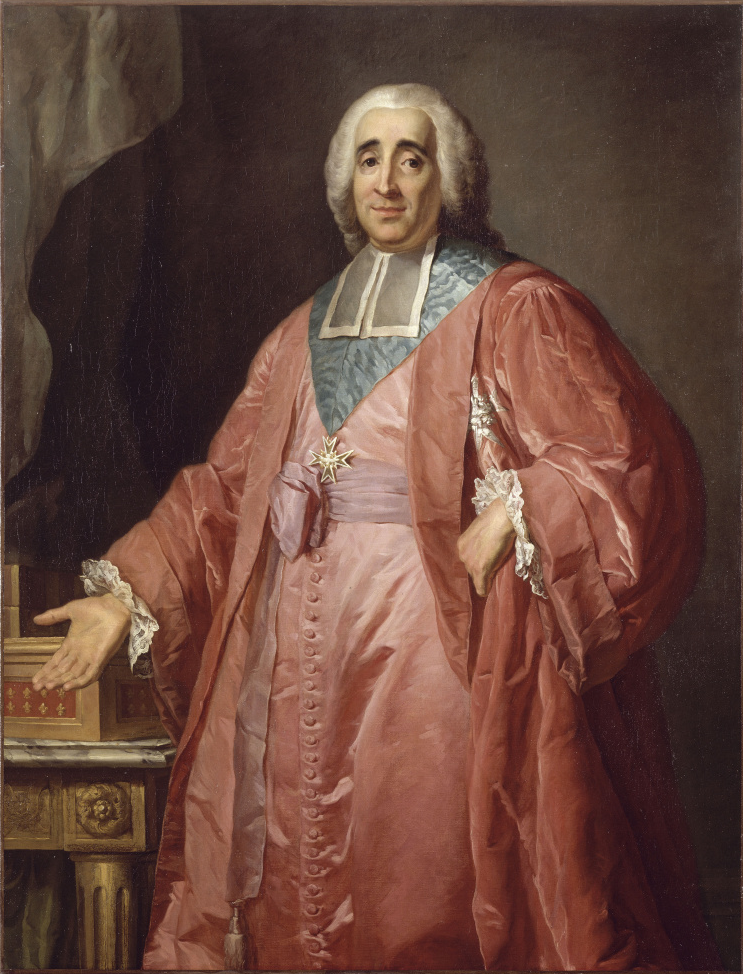
René Nicolas de Maupeou

- Gilles de Maupeou (1553–1641), Controller-General of Finances.
- René Charles de Maupeou (1689–1775), first president of the parlement of Paris.
- René Nicolas de Maupeou (1714–1792), his son, keeper of the Seals and lord chancellor of France.
- Jacques de Maupeou d'Ableiges (1899 - 1963), Senator of the French Republic
- Pierre de Maupeou d'Ableiges (1910 - 1996), French resistant and officer, member of the French equestrian team at the 1948 Summer Olympics
