= Edict of Coucy =

1535 decree of Francis I of France on heresy

King Francis I of France issued the Edict of Coucy on July 16, 1535, ending the persecution of Protestants on the ground that heresy no longer existed in France. It also released religious prisoners and offered amnesty to exiles, providing they abjure heresy.

The edict, which came with a period of leniency or what some refer to as a turn toward appeasement, followed the Nicolas Cop's speech on November 1, 1533, calling for reform in the Catholic Church. It also followed the provocative placards that were posted almost a year later in Paris and elsewhere attacking the Mass as a blasphemy. The placards affair, which was instigated by Antoine Marcourt, was directed at the Catholic doctrine of transubstantiation and accused priests of being the antichrist and that while Cop's speech was deemed humanist, the placards were considered heretical. Conservatives used the offensive nature of the demonstration to pressure the king to adopt a harder line towards heresy. Backed by the king, some dissenters were jailed, twenty-four were executed, and over seventy fled, including Cop and his friend John Calvin.

The edict was introduced as part of Francis I's effort to forge an alliance with the Schmalkaldic League, particularly since figures such as Philip of Hesse did not approve of the religious persecution. It was also partly aimed at addressing the threat of the depopulation of France by raising the issue of the "fugitive religionaries".

The edict freed all of the jailed, and offered amnesty to the exiles. The "Sacramentarians", who held to Zwingli's view of the Eucharist (which had appeared on the placards), were included only if they would repudiate their anti-Romanist views. Francis sought by the edict to assuage the anger of some German Protestant princes with whom he was attempting to form an alliance, which ultimately failed. Even so, he extended pardon to the Sacramentarians in 1536.

The edict continued until it was revoked in December 1538 and, after hostilities resumed, it was replaced by the Edict of Fontainebleau in 1540.
