= Anne du Bourg =

French magistrate and martyr (1521–1559)

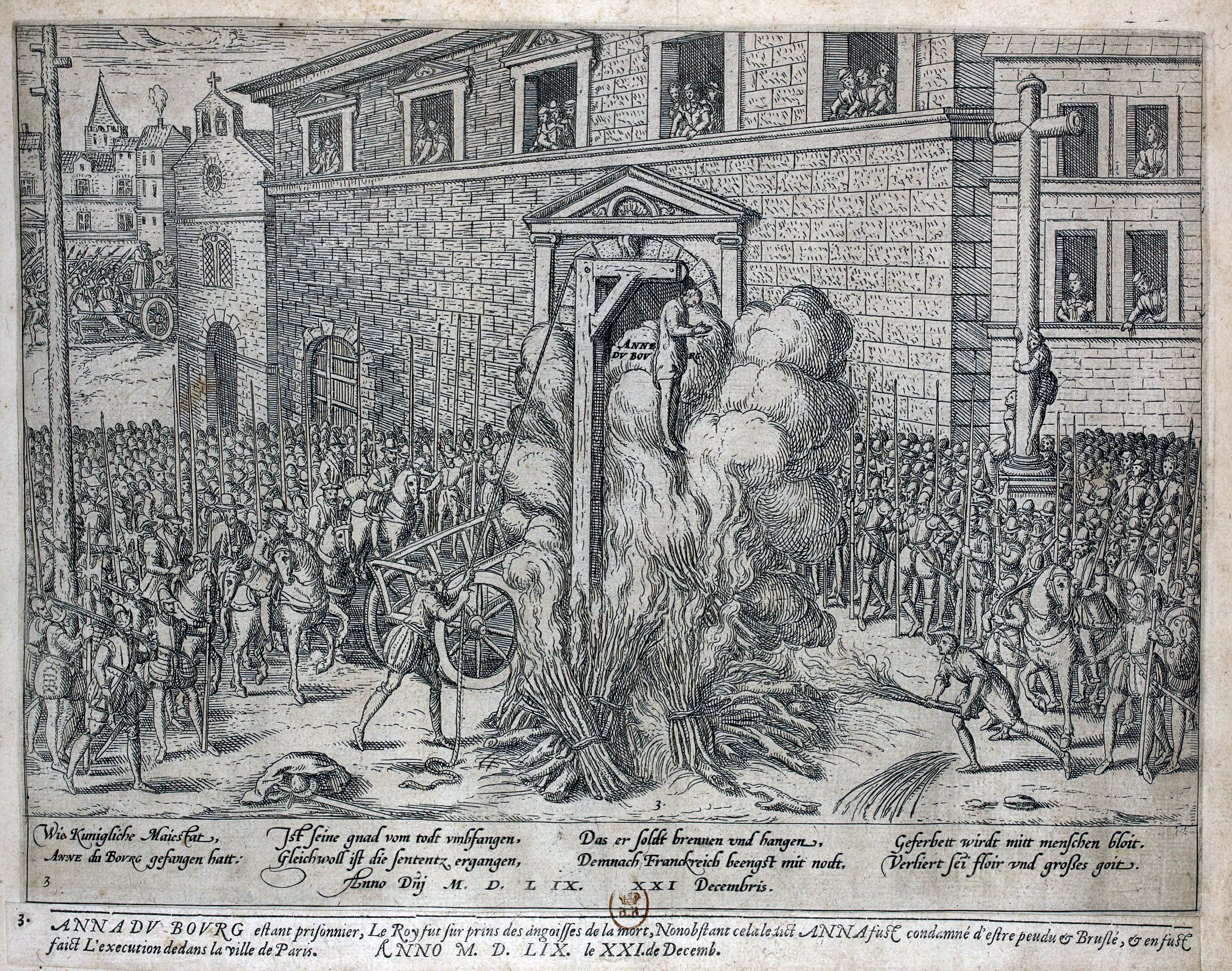
Execution of Anne du Bourg

Anne du Bourg (1521, Riom – 23 December 1559, Paris) was a French magistrate, nephew of the chancellor Antoine du Bourg, and a Protestant martyr.

== Early life ==
Educated at the university of Orléans, he became a professor and had Étienne de la Boétie as a student. He became counsellor of the Parlement of Paris in 1557 by which time he had converted to Protestantism.

== Trial and execution ==
In 1559, after receiving a tip, King Henry II attended a session of Parlement, during which he interjected to express his dissatisfaction at the progress against heresy. One of those who rose to object was du Bourg, who obliquely critiqued Henri's infidelity in comparison to the purity of the Protestant community, arousing Henri's fury. Several days later a special commission was established to try Anne and 5 colleagues in the Parlement. The commission was keen to avoid executing their Parlement colleagues, but while the other accused Protestants were willing to recant and were let off with suspensions from Parlement, Anne refused to follow this route. He maintained his Protestant conviction, refusing to affirm the Catholic doctrine of transubstantiation. Eventually on December 13 he signed an ambiguous confession of faith, avoiding execution, before renouncing it several days later, sealing his fate. He was executed at the Place de Greve on December 23, by strangulation and then burning.
