= Robert le Maçon =

Robert le Maçon (c. 1365 – 28 January 1443) was Chancellor of France, advisor to King Charles VII and supporter of Joan of Arc.

== Life ==
Le Maçon was born at Château-du-Loir, Sarthe. He was ennobled in March 1401, and became six years later a councillor of Louis II, Duke of Anjou. A partisan of the House of Valois-Orléans, he was appointed chancellor to Queen Isabeau of Bavaria on 29 January 1414, on 20 July 1414 commissary of the mint, and in June 1416 chancellor to the Count of Ponthieu, who late became King Charles VII of France. On 16 August 1416n he bought the barony of Trèves in Anjou, and henceforward bore the title of seigneur of Trèves.

When Paris was surprised by the Burgundians on the night of 29 May 1418 he assisted Tanneguy III du Châtel in saving Dauphin Charles. His devotion to the cause of the latter having brought down on him the wrath of John the Fearless, Duke of Burgundy. He was excluded from the political amnesty known as the peace of Saint-Maur-des-Fosses, though he retained his seat on the king's council. He was by the Dauphin's side when John the Fearless was murdered at the bridge of Montereau on 10 September 1419. He resigned the seals at the beginning of 1422; but he continued to exercise great influence, and in 1426 he effected a reconciliation between the King and John V, Duke of Brittany.

Having been captured by Jean de Langeac, seneschal of Auvergne, in August 1426, he was shut up for three months in the château of Usson. When set at liberty he returned to court, where he staunchly supported Joan of Arc against all the cabals that menaced her. It was he who signed the patent of nobility for the Arc family in December 1429.

In 1430 he was once more entrusted with an embassy to Brittany.

Having retired from political life in 1436, he died on 28 January 1443, and was interred at Trèves, where his epitaph may still be seen.
