= Paris coup d'état and massacres of 1418 =

1418 massacres in Paris, France

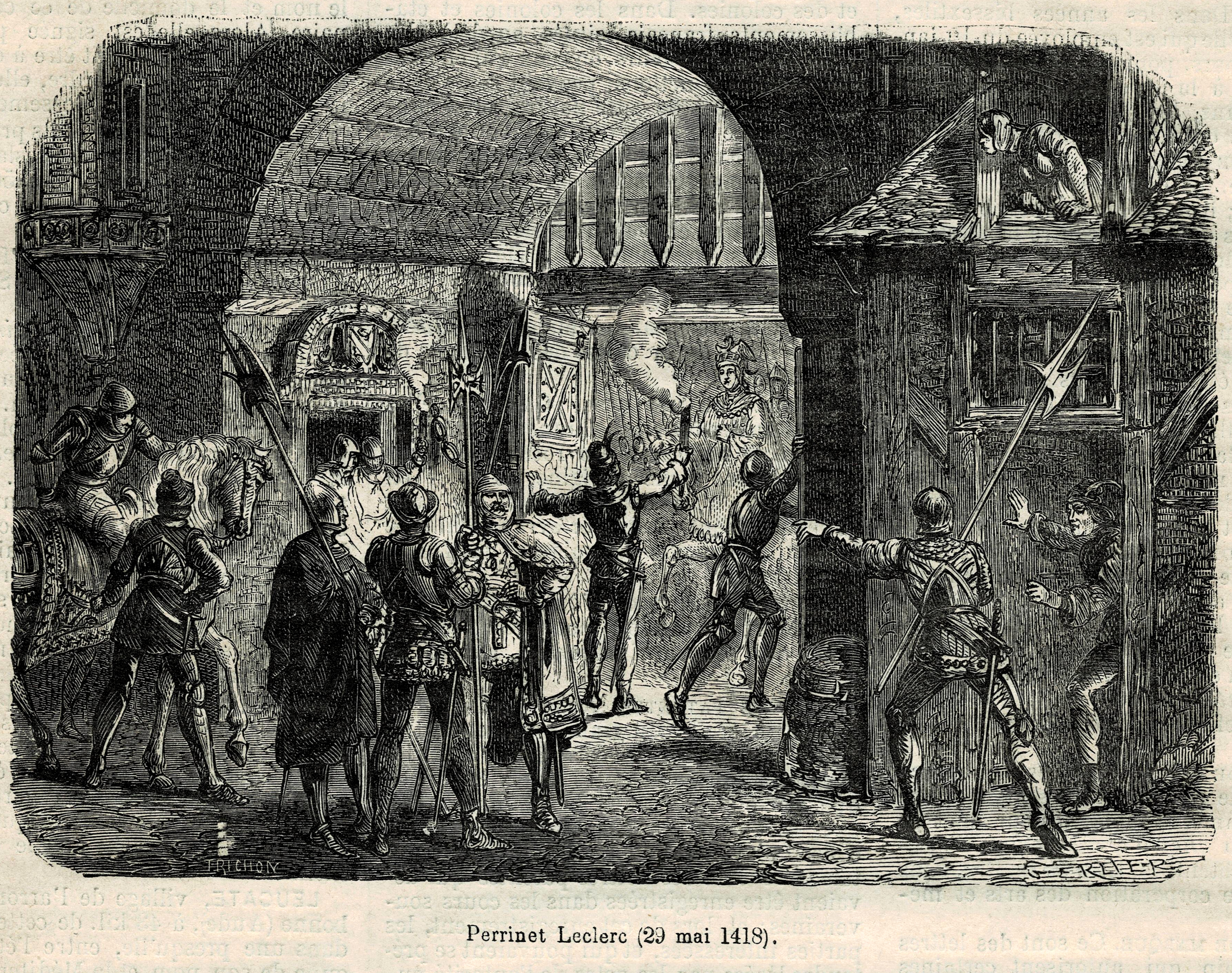
Burgundian entry into Paris, 29 May 1418 (from a 19th-century drawing)

In a coup d'état in Paris on the morning of 29 May 1418, the Burgundian party seized control of the king, the infirm Charles VI, from the Armagnacs. An attempt by the Armagnacs to retake the city on 31 May failed. On 12–13 June, a mob attacked the prisons where the Armagnacs and their supporters were held. Between one and two thousand people were killed. Among the dead were a constable of France, a chancellor of France, four bishops and several university professors. On 21 August, there was another lesser massacre of Armagnac prisoners.

== Background ==
The events in Paris in 1418 took place amidst an ongoing civil war between the Armagnac and Burgundian factions, itself taking place against the background of the ongoing English invasion of France. A peace conference between the French factions convened at La Tombe in April 1418. The government, dominated by Armagnacs, was represented by Regnault de Chartres; the Burgundians by Henri de Savoisy; and Charles, Duke of Orléans, by his chancellor, Guillaume Cousinot. While the conference was ongoing, the Armagnacs were besieging Senlis, held by the Burgundians.

At the start of negotiations, the Armagnac position was the weaker. They were prepared to concede almost all of the Burgundians' demands save that the duke of Burgundy, John the Fearless, be permitted to enter Paris at any time with any force, seeing that such an admission would permit the duke in practice to tear up any agreement. On 19 April, the leader of the Armagnacs, Count Bernard VII of Armagnac, the constable of France, was forced to lift the siege of Senlis and retreat to Paris. There he stripped the wealth from the churches to pay his troops. Sensing unrest, the soldiers increased their street patrols. The Parisians themselves strongly favoured the Burgundian faction. Most of the Armagnac troops occupying the capital were from southern France and were regarded as foreigners.

Having adjourned before the relief of Senlis, the conference at La Tombe reconvened in early May with two papal legates present, Giordano Orsini and Guillaume Fillastre. On 13 May, the negotiators agreed to a general amnesty and restitution of property while leaving the more important matters for future negotiation. The terms gave the duke access to the king under controlled conditions. The Armagnacs were divided on the agreement, with the count himself strongly opposed. The Dauphin Charles summoned a great council to the Louvre on 26 May. The council approved the terms and they were published on 27 May while the bells of Paris rang out. The chancellor, Henri de Marle, refused to seal the document. All the negotiations were preempted, however, by a Burgundian coup d'état.

== Coup d'état of 29 May ==
The seizure of Paris had been planned by Jean de Villiers de L'Isle-Adam, the Burgundian captain of Pontoise. He had been secretly visited by Perrinet le Clerc, the son of the quartenier (captain of the watch) and keeper of the Porte de Buci. Perrinet had been roughed up by the retinue of an Armagnac councillor days earlier. He agreed to steal his father's keys and unlock the gate on the night of 28–29 May, when he was on watch duty.

Before dawn on 29 May, as planned, the watchmen lowered the drawbridge of the Porte de Buci to admit several hundred Burgundian troops under Jean de Villiers, Claude de Beauvoir of Chastellux and Guy Le Veau de Bar. The invaders silently made their way to the square in front of the Châtelet, where they found a sympathetic group of armed citizens. They then dispersed throughout the city calling the people to arms.

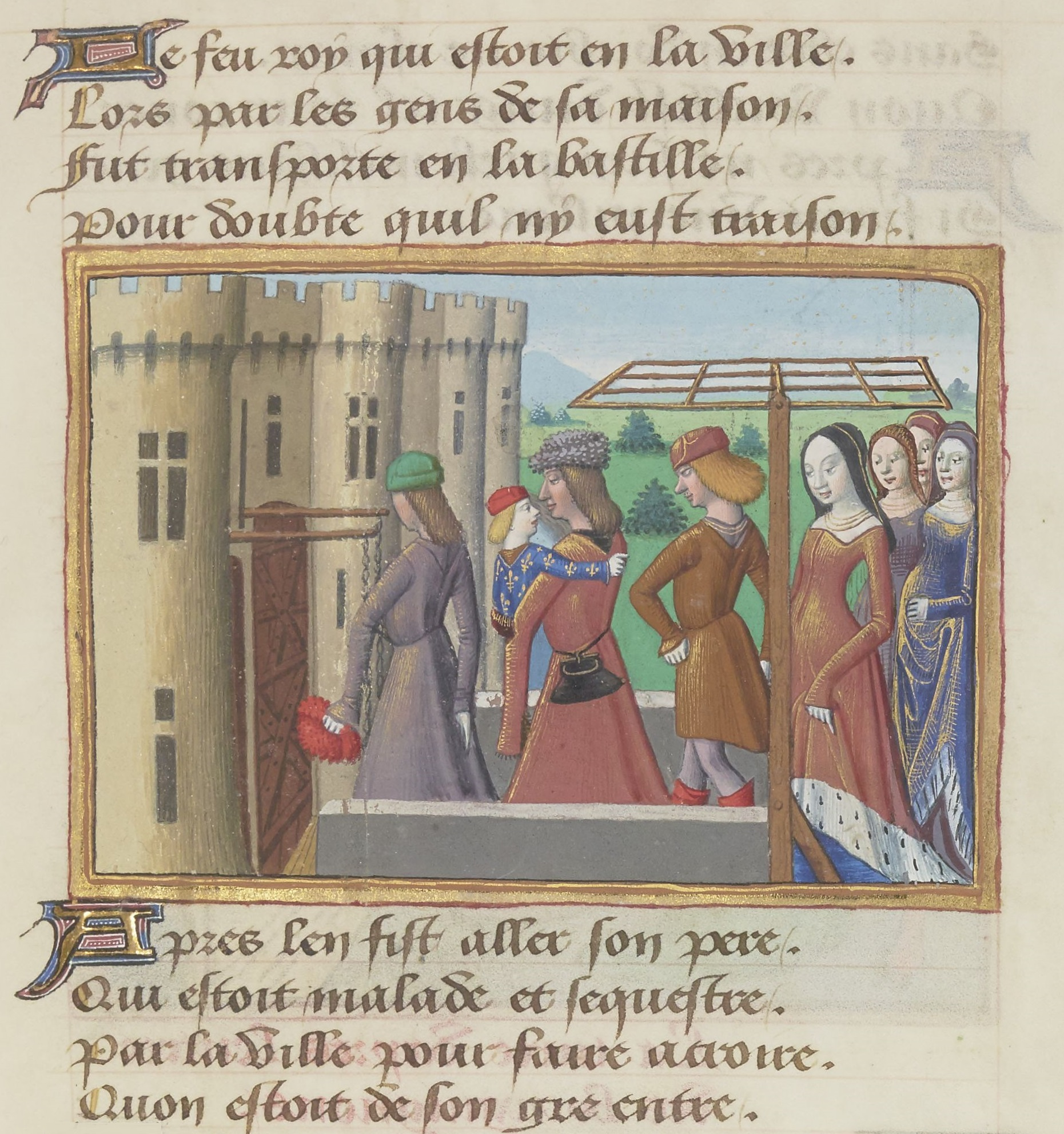
Tanneguy carries the Dauphin to safety, illustration from a copy of Martial d'Auvergne's Les Vigiles de la mort de Charles VII (1490s)

Jean de Villiers, Claude de Beauvoir and Guy Le Veau marched to the Hôtel Saint-Pol, where the king received them. The Armagnac captain Tanneguy du Châtel seized the Dauphin from his bed in a palace on the rue de Pute-y-Musse, wrapped him in a sheet and brought him to the Bastille, which had gates to both the city and the outside. (Today, a plaque on the rue Saint-André-des-Arts commemorates this event.) From the Bastille, Tanneguy sent a message to the captain of Saint-Denis. By the time reinforcements arrived, the Burgundians were in control of the city and were arresting the leading Armagnacs. Count Bernard himself hid in a neighbour's house but was betrayed to Jean de Villiers.

The main Armagnac supporters of the peace were spared, including the bishop, Gérard de Montaigu; the archbishop of Reims, Regnault de Chartres; and Cardinal Fillastre. Those arrested included the chancellor and five bishops. The Count of Armagnac at first hid in the house of a mason but was betrayed and arrested. The heir of the duke of Bourbon, Charles, was brought to the Hôtel Saint-Pol. Among the prominent Armagnacs to escape was Jean I Jouvenel des Ursins, president of the Court of Aids.

Only three Armagnacs were killed—lynched by the crowd—during the coup itself on 29 May. About ten more were killed on 30 May.

== Counterattack of 31 May ==
A few Armagnac officials took refuge in the Bastille with Tanneguy and the Dauphin, defended by the garrison and 300 reinforcements from Saint-Denis. Around noon on 29 May, to avoid being besieged in the Bastille, Tanneguy, the Dauphin and most of the soldiers left for the fortified bridge at Charenton. Detachments were sent to the towns of Meaux, Corbeil and Melun to reassure the Armagnac garrisons. The Dauphin was brought to Melun. Tanneguy was soon joined at Charenton by the marshal, Pierre de Rieux, with 700 men, bringing the troop total to about 1,000.

In anticipation of an Armagnac attempt to recapture the city, the king was moved from the Hôtel Saint-Pol to the Louvre. On the night of 31 May, Pierre de Rieux re-entered the Bastille with 300 men and captured Porte Saint-Antoine, which he then opened to a force of 400 men under Tanneguy. The barricades on the rue Saint-Antoine fell one by one to Tanneguy's men, aided by artillery fire from the Bastille. According to the Journal d'un bourgeois de Paris, the attackers shouted, "Kill them all!" They were finally turned back at the Porte Baudoyer by the combined forces of the watch, the Burgundians and the citizens. Tanneguy lost 160 or about half his men before gaining the safety of the Bastille.

== Aftermath of the counterattack ==
In the aftermath of the failed counterattack, most of those taken prisoner were killed. There followed a general riot that ended in the roundup and massacre of more than 500 suspected Armagnacs. Some Armagnacs surrendered at the Grand Châtelet for their own safety. The authorities then transferred the high-value prisoners Henri de Marle and the Count of Armagnac to the more secure Conciergerie. According to the Journal d'un bourgeois de Paris, women and children cursed the corpses of the Armagnacs in the streets. A rumour spread that the Armagnac supporters—thought to number about 16,000—were being given special insignia so they could be spared in the next Armagnac assault.

After the failure of the counterattack, there were several efforts to restart negotiations. On 1 June, the Dauphin and Cardinal Fillastre met at the bridge of Charenton. Shortly after, the Dauphin was moved from Melun to Bourges. A newly formed Royal Council composed of Burgundians resolved to invite the Dauphin to return to Paris and assume the government. At Bourges, the Dauphin was prepared to negotiate his return.

On 4 June, the Armagnac garrisons in the Bastille, Charenton and Saint-Cloud withdrew to Melun.

== Massacre of 12–13 June ==
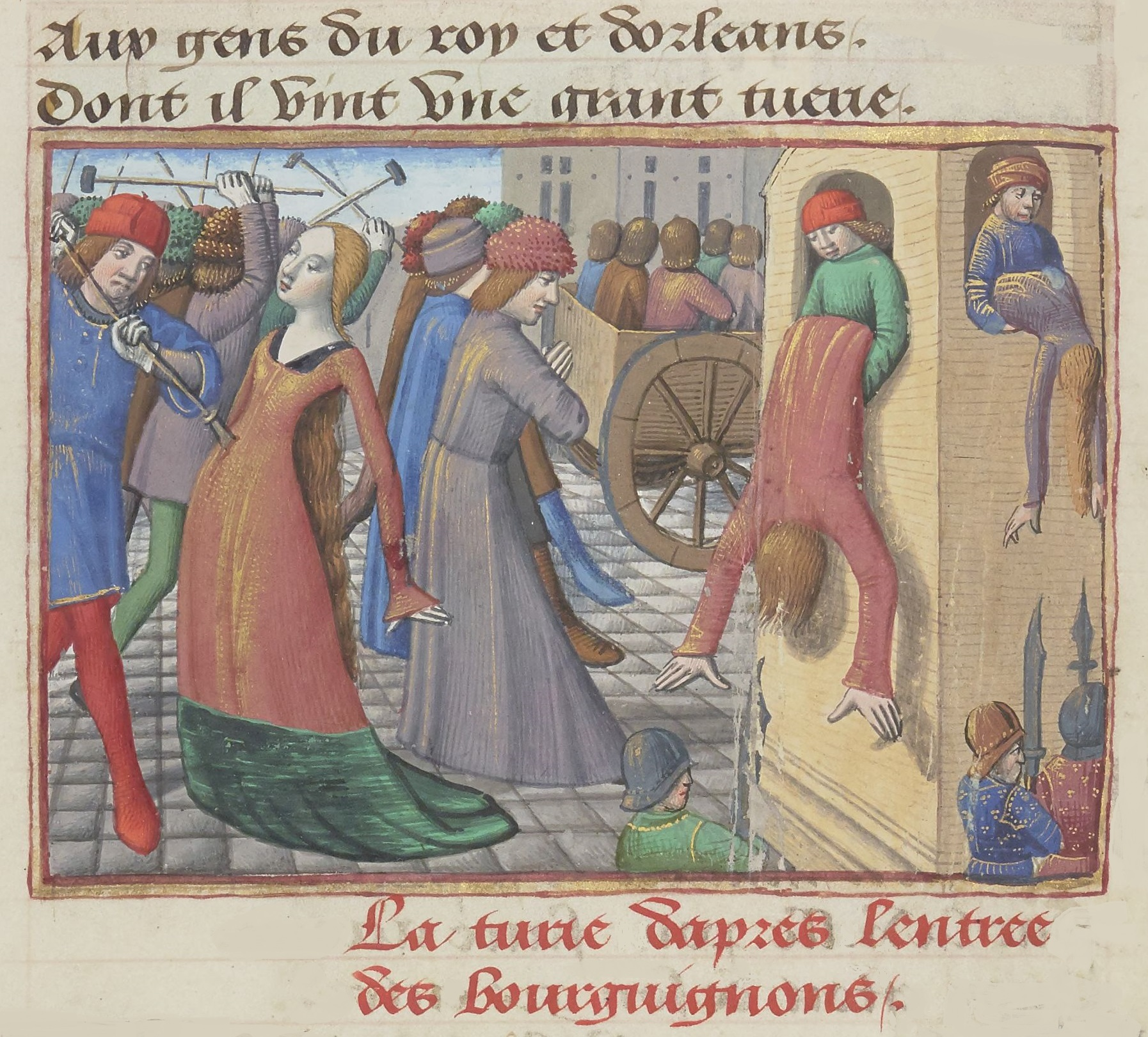
The massacres by Parisian mobs in 1418, illustration from a copy of Martial d'Auvergne's Les Vigiles de la mort de Charles VII (1490s)

Before dawn on 12 June 1418, the alarm was raised that an Armagnac army was approaching the Porte Bordelle. Although false, it filled the streets with angry crowds. About 4,000 congregated in the Place de Grève. Leaders spontaneously appeared: a potter named Lambert, a tinsmith and some butchers. The crowd demanded the execution of the prisoners and of foreigners. Some Genoese crossbowmen were lynched and the Italian quarter was sacked. After the sun came up, men from the countryside joined the general looting. The houses of suspected Armagnacs were raided, their residents killed. Italian bankers and the College of Navarre were also targeted.

In the evening, the mob attacked the Palais de la Cité. There followed a series of attacks on the prisons. The first target was the Conciergerie, where Henri de Marle, the Count of Armagnac and the prisoners with them were dragged out and beaten to death. The saltire of Armagnac was carved into the count's body. The mob then attacked the prison of the priory of Saint-Éloi. All the prisoners were killed except the abbot of Saint-Denis, Philippe de Villette, who escaped to the church and was rescued by Jean de Villiers.

The third target was the Petit Châtelet, where clergy and scholars were being held. The guards held off the mob but allowed a small group to bring out the prisoners one by one. They were hacked to death by the crowd and their bodies thrown into the Seine. Among the victims was Henri de Marle's son, Jean de Marle.

At the Grand Châtelet, the mob met stiffer resistance, since the guards armed the prisoners and jointly they defended the building for hours before being overcome. The prisoners were thrown from the gallery and killed in the courtyard. The mob moved on to the bishop's prison, the Temple, the abbey of Saint-Magloire and the priory of Saint-Martin. The killings lasted until mid-morning the following day, 13 June.

== Responses to the June massacre ==
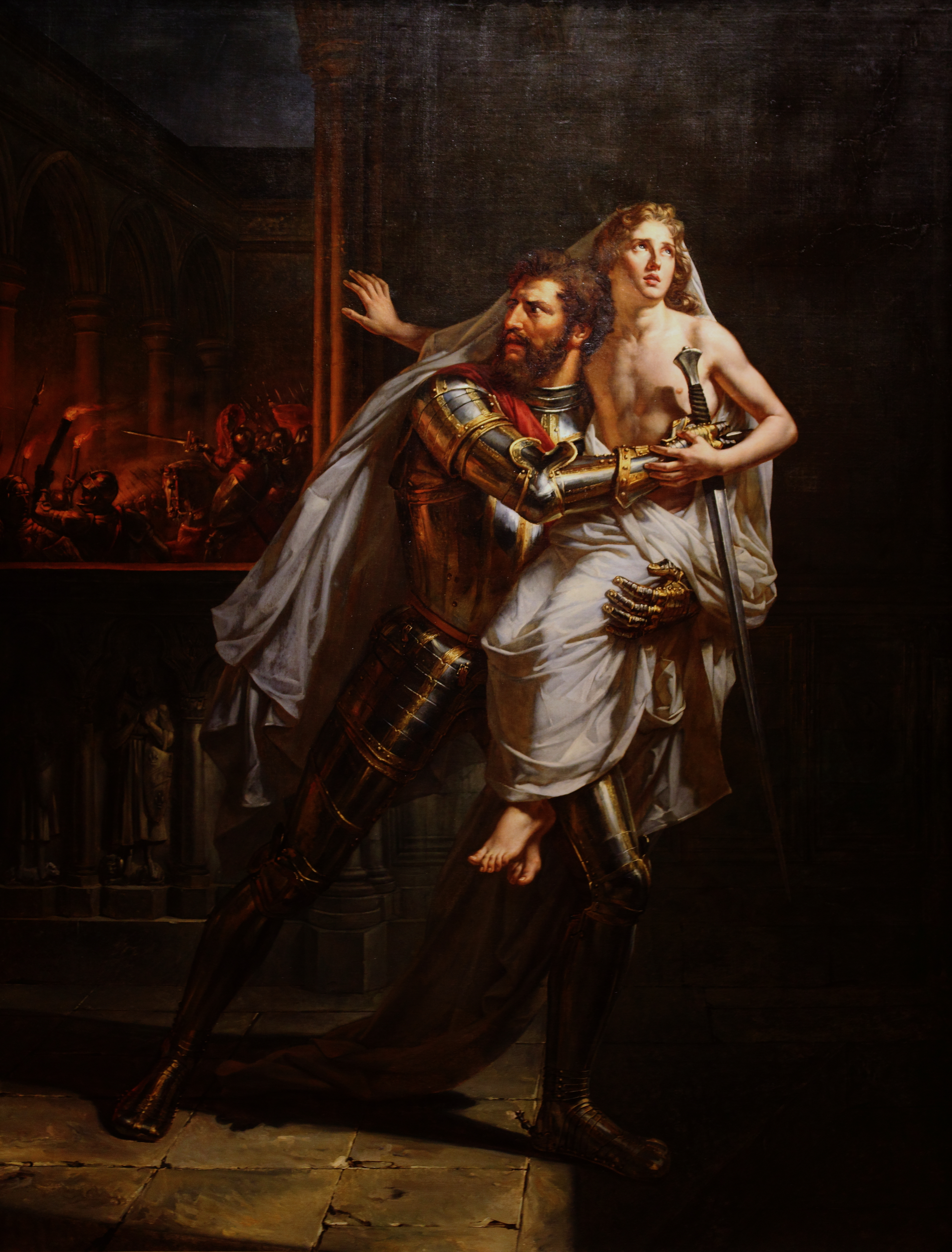
Tanneguy du Châtel sauvant le dauphin, painting by Auguste Couder (1828)

Some Armagnacs accused the duke of Burgundy, John the Fearless, of personally leading the massacres, but he was not in Paris at the time. Although he was not directly involved and his lieutenants on the scene in fact sought to control the crowd, the duke's reputation was tarnished. Modern historians assess that the Burgundian leadership had little involvement in the massacres.

On 29 June, the Dauphin, invoking his authority as lieutenant, conferred on him by the Royal Council—then dominated by Armagnacs—the previous year, assumed the government of France. Denouncing the massacres in Paris, he declared that the king was in effect a prisoner acting under duress and that order's from Paris bearing his seal should be ignored. The delegation of the new Royal Council, led by Fillastre, reached the Dauphin at Bourges in the middle of July. The latter informed the cardinal that he had no intention of ever returning to Paris.

== Massacre of 21 August ==
Although the Burgundian authorities attempted to restore order in Paris and John the Fearless moved into the city, the populace was increasingly on edge during the summer. An outbreak of smallpox killed an estimated quarter of the population between June and October. The summer was unusually hot. Having been under varying states of blockade since 1410 and with its hinterland subject to constant raids by both sides, the city was burgeoning with refugees while its stocks of grain were plummeting. Poor economic conditions were blamed on the Armagnacs. The prisons, meanwhile, had been filled up again both by prisoners taken in raids and by denunciations of supposed Armagnac sympathizers.

On the evening of 20 August, a mob of between 3,000 and 4,000 Parisians gathered outside the Grand Châtelet. Their main leader was the executioner Capeluche, who rode on horseback. The leaders of the Cabochien revolt of 1413—the brothers Legoix and Saint-Yon and the skinner Simon Caboche—also joined. In the pre-dawn hours of 21 August, they attacked the Châtelet, scaled the walls, dragged out the prisoners and killed about 200 of them.

According to the chronicler Michel Pintoin, they then turned on the haute bourgeoisie, killing them and looting their houses. All the chronicles report how a pregnant woman was stipped naked and beheaded, while Jouvenel des Ursins adds the detail that the murderers mocked the fetus as it struggled in its dead mother.

When the mob attempted to invade the Bastille, the guards removed the prisoners to Vincennes. There were only twelve prisoners, all former officers of either the king or the Dauphin. The duke of Burgundy arrived and ordered the crowd to disperse, but he did not have sufficient forces with him to enforce the order. When Capeluche produced an Armagnac standard the people claimed to have found in one of the bourgeois houses, the duke relented and agreed to hand over the prisoners, ostensibly for trial at the Petit Châtelet. According to Jean Raoulet, the executioner called the duke "brother" when they shook hands on a deal to spare certain prisoners. None of the prisoners turned over to the mob were spared. They were lynched by another mob in the streets.

The mob proceeded to raid the Petit Châtelet, the Louvre and the Hôtel de Bourbon for prisoners to kill. Between 80 and 100 more were killed. Denunciations of supposed Armagnacs continued into the afternoon. The duke ultimately stopped the massacres with a ruse. He announced that the Armagnacs were massing at Montlhéry and the mob marched out to attack them. Capeluche and two of his accomplices were arrested and beheaded in Les Halles, while crossbowmen were posted at every corner to control the crowd. When his followers at Montlhéry realized what had happened a few days later, they found the gates of Paris were closed to them. The duke then forbade authorized assemblies and forced the Parisians to swear an oath of obedience to him.

== Victims ==
Between one and two thousand people were killed in the June massacre. Among the dead were:

- Bernard VII, Count of Armagnac, constable of France
- Henri de Marle, chancellor of France
- Jean de Marle, bishop of Coutances
- Gontier Col, diplomat
- Benoit Gentien, university professor who had prosecuted Jean Petit for defending tyrannicide
- Jean de Montreuil, propagandist
- Hector de Chartres, father of Regnault de Chartres

Besides Jean de Marle and Benoit Gentien, three other bishops and several other university professors were killed. Many of the victims were "the usual occupants of Parisian jails: petty criminals, debtors, victims of malicious denunciations". The killing was indiscriminate and prison guards, women and Burgundian sympathizers were caught in it. The bodies were piled in the streets for days, but eventually buried in mass graves in the refuse ditches outside the city. The prominent Armagnacs went unburied. They were thrown on the dung heap outside the Porte Saint-Martin.

Between 200 and 300 prisoners survived the massacre. Jacques Gélu, the archbishop of Tours, was among the prominent men to escape.

About 300 were killed on 21 August. Across both massacres, the death toll was probably near 2,500, perhaps as high as 5,000.

== Works cited ==
- Cassagnes-Brouquet, Sophie (2006). "L'intervention du genre dans l'événement: Les massacres parisiens de 1418 et le meurtre d'une femme". In Marc Bergère; Luc Capdevila (eds.). Genre et événement. Presses universitaires de Rennes. doi:10.4000/books.pur.20197.
- Sizer, Michael (2007). "The Calamity of Violence: Reading the Paris Massacres of 1418". Journal of the Western Society for French History. 35: 19–39.
- Sumption, Jonathan (2016). The Hundred Years War, Volume 4: Cursed Kings. Faber & Faber.
