= Regnault de Chartres =

French cardinal, archbishop, peer of France and chancellor of France

His Eminence Regnault de Chartres
- Cardinal, Archbishop of Rheims
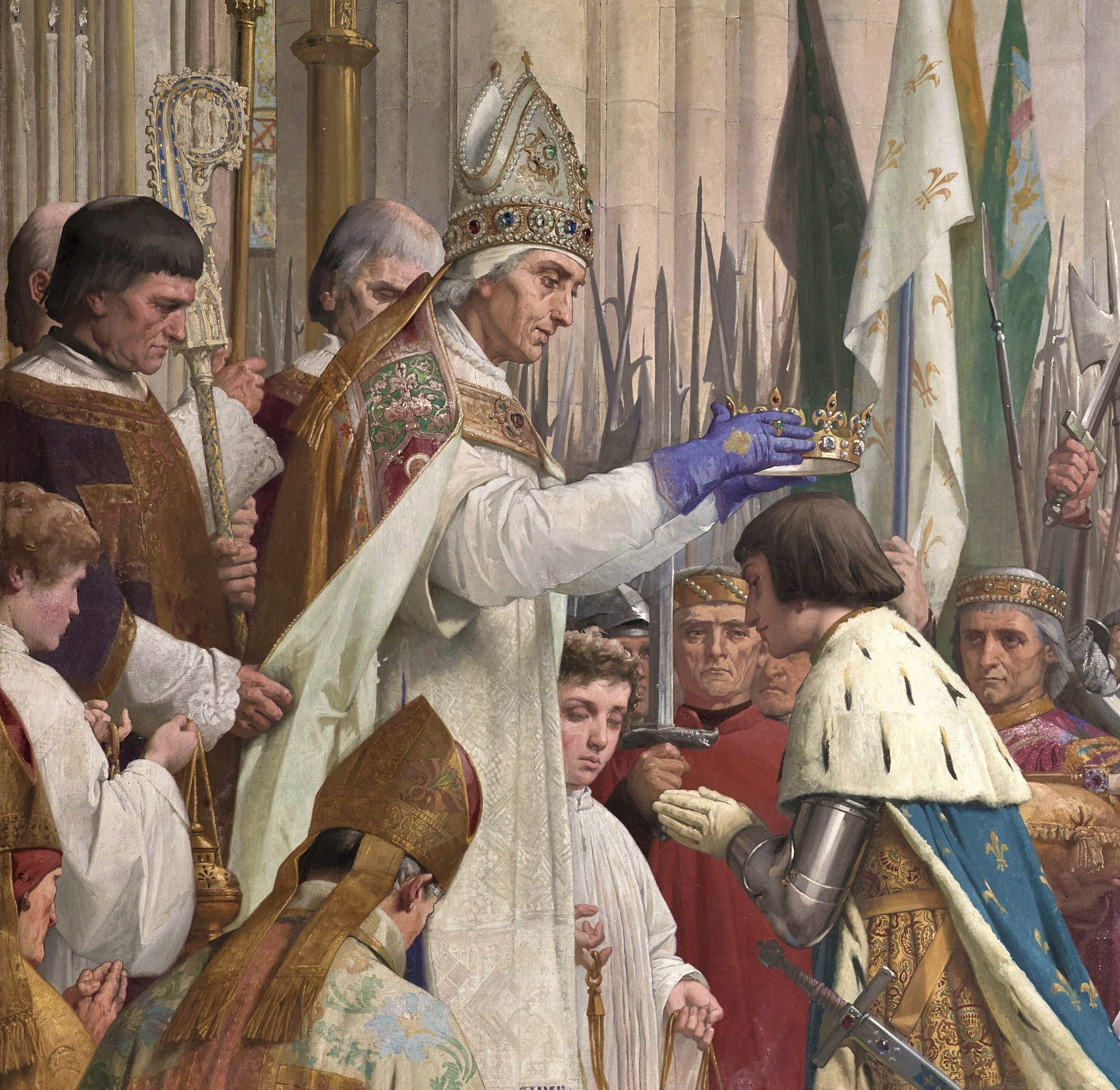
- Regnault de Chartres crowns Charles VII king in Rheims Cathedral (by Jules Eugène Lenepveu, 1889).
- Other posts: 1414 Archbishop of Rheims; 1436 Bishop of Agde (apostolic administrator); 1439 Bishop of Orléans (in commendam)

Orders
- Created cardinal: 18 December 1439 by Pope Eugene IV
- Rank: Cardinal priest of Santo Stefano al Monte Celio

Personal details
- Born: c. 1380 Ons-en-Bray, Kingdom of France
- Died: 4 April 1444 Tours, Kingdom of France
- Denomination: Roman Catholic

Chancellor of France
- In office 1424; 1428-1444
- Monarch: Charles VII
- Preceded by: Martin Gouges
- Succeeded by: Guillaume Jouvenel des Ursins

Regnault de Chartres (c. 1380 in Ons-en-Bray - 4 April 1444 in Tours) was a French cardinal, archbishop of Rheims, peer of France (as Archbishop-Duke of Rheims) and chancellor of France during the reign of King Charles VII of France. In 1429 during the Hundred Years' War he anointed and crowned the dauphin Charles king of France in Rheims, thus upholding the Valois dynasty's claim to the French throne against the English claim of King Henry VI of England.

== Early life ==
Regnault de Chartres was born from the second marriage of his father, Hector de Chartres, Lord of Lyons-en-Beauvaisis, Ons-en-Bray (beheaded in Paris in 1418) with Blanche de Clermont-Nesle.

Regnault had two brothers: the elder one, Pierre de Chartres, and Hector de Chartres the Younger (killed in 1415 at Agincourt). It is possible, but not certain, that these de Chartres belong to the notable house of the vidames de Chartres (it is generally accepted that Regnault was related to the family of Beauvilliers; but the arms of the latter are very similar to those of the vidames, bearing bands and merlettes), and/or to the Chartres family of Ver-lès-Chartres from the 12th-13th centuries.

== During the reign of Charles VI ==
He was a canon in the chapter of the Beauvais Cathedral and was elected its dean in 1404. Subsequently, he served as chamberlain and referendary of antipope John XXIII and presided over the Paris Court of Accounts. He was appointed to the archbishopric of Rheims on 2 January 1414 but he did not take office until 16 July 1429, the day before the coronation of Charles VII. In 1415 he attended the Council of Constance.

On 16 August 1418 he was named lieutenant du roi and adviser to the Dauphin, in the provinces of Languedoc, Lyonnais and Mâconnais.

== During the reign of Charles VII ==
On 28 March 1424 he became chancellor, succeeding Martin Gouge for several months until the latter was reinstated. He was again appointed chancellor of France on 8 November 1428. He participated in the war councils in Orleans.

The king sold him the city of Vierzon on 7 August 1425.

On 17 July 1429 he consecrated Charles VII in Rheims, in the presence of Joan of Arc. On 10 October, on safe conduct, he left for Saint-Denis to negotiate with the English represented by the bishop of Thérouanne, Lewis of Luxembourg, counselor of Henry VI of England.

On 26 July 1432 he received 600 mouton d’or from the king for negotiating a peace treaty in Auxerre. He was appointed to the Archbishopric of Embrun by Pope Eugene IV in 1434, but preferred to stay in Rheims.

On 6 July 1435 he was in Arras to negotiate a treaty with the Duke of Burgundy, Philip the Good, then in Calais to reduce the tensions between France and England.

On 4 April 1436 he was named administrator of the bishopric of Agde, and officiated at the wedding of the Dauphin Louis to Margaret of Scotland, on 24 June in Tours.

Pope Eugene IV appointed him to the bishopric of Orléans in commendam on 17 March 1439. He took possession of it on 25 October, and officiated at the wedding of Charles, Duke of Orléans and Mary of Cleves in 1440 in Saint-Omer. In recognition of his services, the king obtained for him the position of cardinal: he was named cardinal at the General Council held in Florence on 18 December 1439, and took over the titular church of Santo Stefano al Monte Celio on 8 January 1440.

== Death ==
He was given the bishopric of Mende in 1444 when, after mid-Lent, he went to Tours to see Charles VII and conduct peace negotiations with England. As he was going to speak to the king, he was taken with an illness and died suddenly on 4 April 1444. He was buried in the (now destroyed) Fransciscan church.

After his death his archbishopric remained vacant for almost seven months.

The arms of Regnault de Chartres are emblazoned as follows: Argent, a two fess gules.

Political offices
Preceded by Martin Gouge	Chancellor of France; 28 March 1424 - 6 August 1424	Succeeded by Martin Gouge
Preceded by Martin Gouge	Chancellor of France; 1428 – 1444	Succeeded by Guillaume Jouvenel des Ursins
Catholic Church titles
Preceded by Pierre Trousseau	Archbishop of Rheims; 1414–1444	Succeeded by Jacques Jouvenel des Ursins
Preceded by Jean Teste	Bishop of Agde; 1436–1439	Succeeded by Guillaume Charrier
Preceded by Guillaume Charrier	Bishop of Orléans; 1439–1444	Succeeded by Jean du Gué
Preceded by Vacant	Cardinal Priest of S. Stefano al Monte Celio; 1440–1444	Succeeded by Jean d'Arces
