= Henry of Marle (died 1418) =

French politician

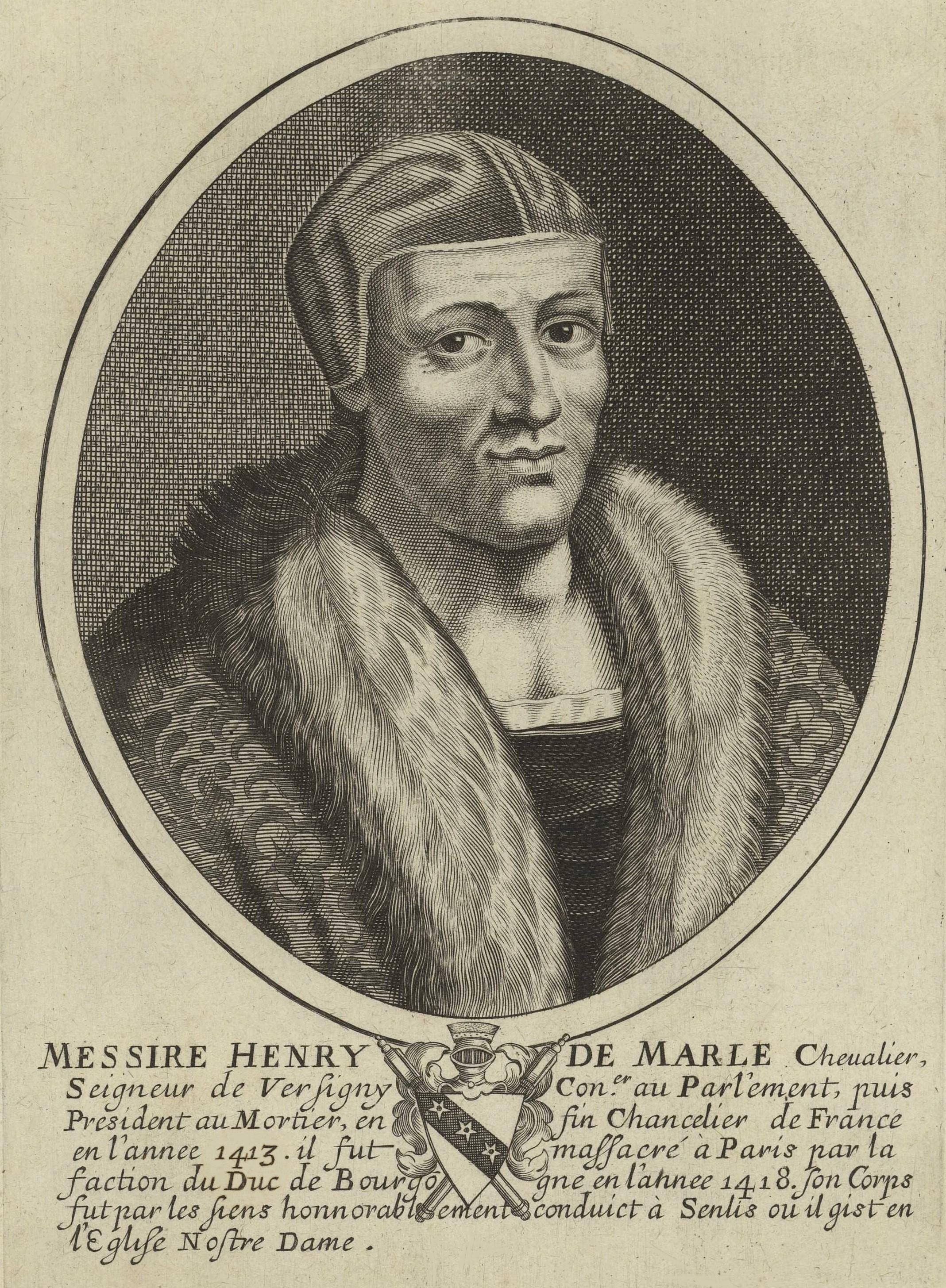
Henri de Marle

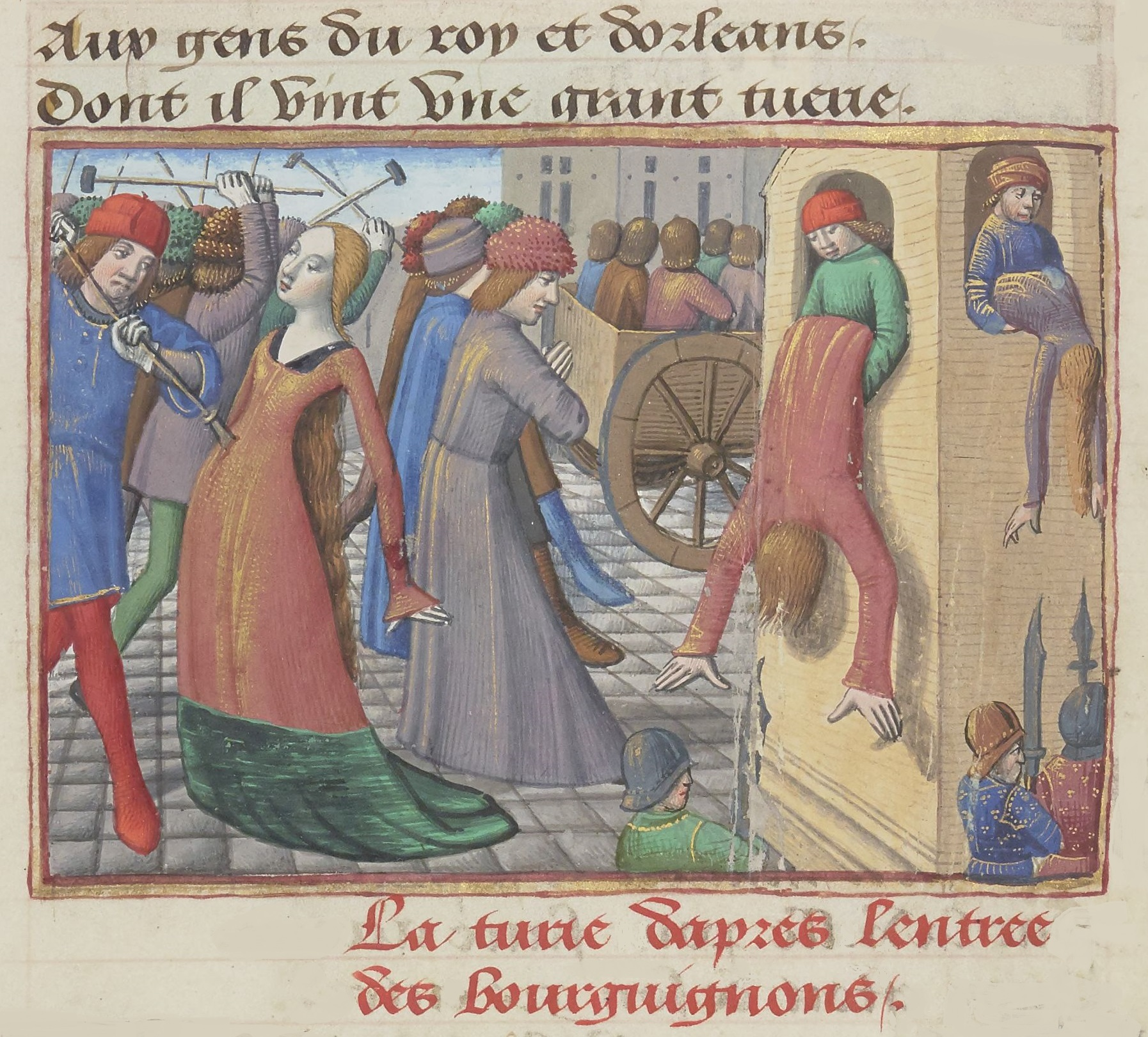
Massacres of 1418

Henry of Marle, seigneur de Presles, was chancellor of France under king Charles VI from 1413 to 1418. As a faithful companion of John I of Berry, he was assassinated in the Conciergerie during the massacres of the Armagnacs in the prisons of Paris on 29 May 1418.

== Sources ==
- Françoise Autrand, Charles VI le roi fou
