= Chancellor of France =

Head of the judiciary of Ancien-era France

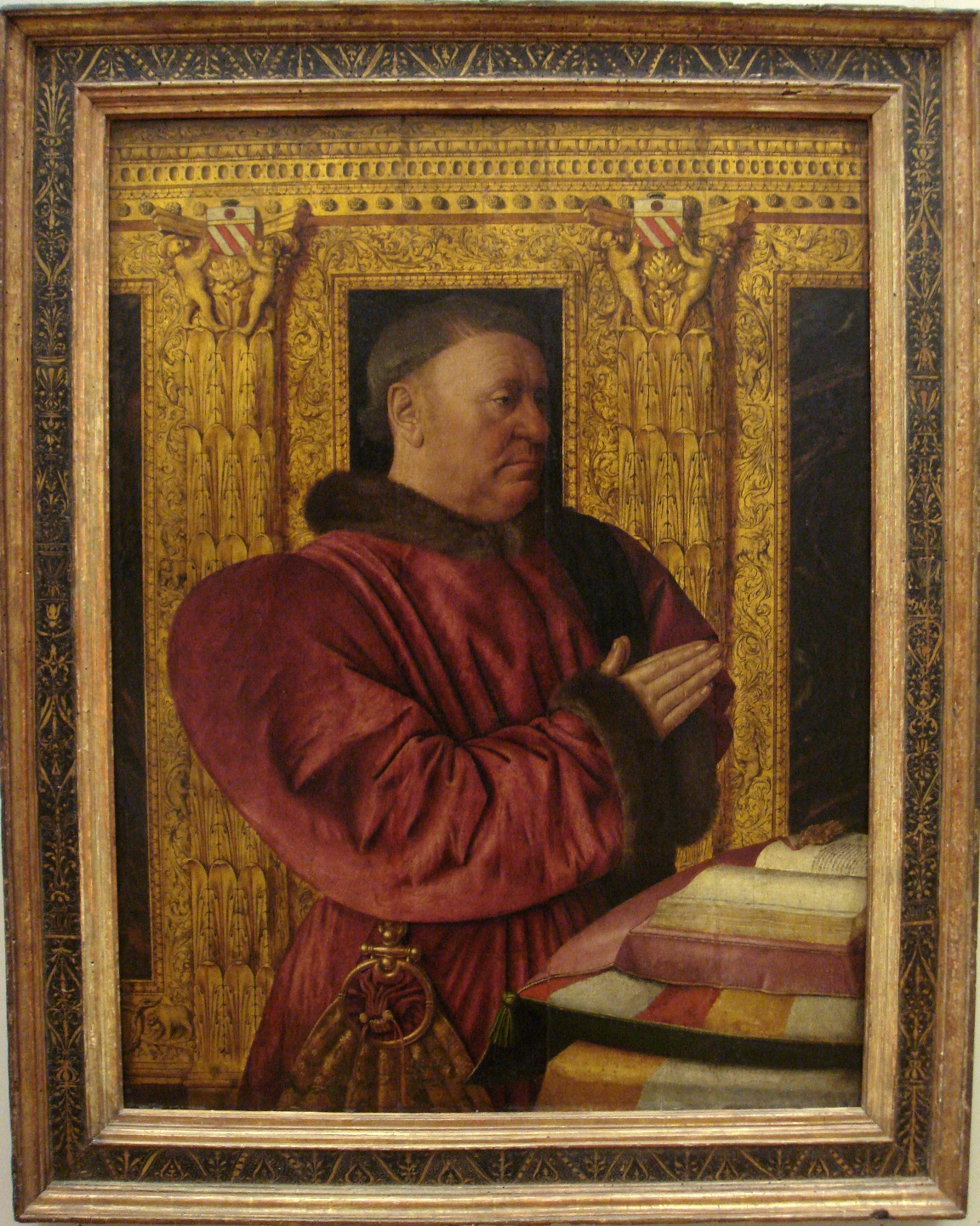
Guillaume Jouvenel des Ursins, by Jean Fouquet, Musée du Louvre, Paris.

The Chancellor of France (French: Chancelier de France), also known as the Grand Chancellor or Lord Chancellor, was the officer of state responsible for the judiciary of the Kingdom of France. The Chancellor was responsible for seeing that royal decrees were enrolled and registered by the sundry parlements, provincial appellate courts. However, since the Chancellor was appointed for life, and might fall from favour, or be too ill to carry out his duties, his duties would occasionally fall to his deputy, the Keeper of the Seals of France (Garde des sceaux de France).

The last Chancellor died in 1790, by which time the French Revolution was well underway, and the position was left vacant. Instead, in 1791, the Chancellor's portfolio and responsibilities were assigned to the Keeper of the Seals who was accordingly given the additional title of Minister of Justice under the Revolutionary government. After the Bourbon Restoration in 1814, the position of the Chancellor was divorced from its judicial responsibilities and re-established as president of the Chamber of Peers, the upper house of the French parliament until 1848. The last Chancellor was Etienne-Denis Pasquier, appointed by King Louis Philippe I in 1837.

== Frankish chancellors under the Merovingians and Carolingians ==
- 496–533: Rémi de Reims, known as Saint Rémi (Référendaire of France)
- 561: Siggo, référendaire to Sigebert I, then to Chilperic I and to Childebert II
- 618–638: Romain de Rouen, known as Saint Romain, bishop of Rouen
- 638–657: Dadon, known as Saint Ouen, grand référendaire to Dagobert I and also to Clovis II
- 657–695: Ansbert, bishop of Rouen, référendaire
- 695–710: Saint Bonit, bishop of Auvergne, référendaire to Sigebert III, king of Austrasia
- 652–673: Robert II, référendaire to Clotaire III
- 750–768: Fulard, Abbot of St. Denis, chancellor to Pepin the Short
- 796–800: Alcuin, Abbot of Tours, chancellor to Charlemagne as king of the Franks, prepared the Capitulaire De Villis
- 800–819: Fridgise, chancellor to Charlemagne, then to Louis the Pious
- 819–832: Adalard, chancellor to Louis the Pious

See also Royal Administration of Merovingian and Carolingian Dynasties.

== Chancellors of France ==
Chancellor		Begin	End
Renaud de Vendôme	Bishop of Paris	989	991
Gerbert d'Aurillac	later Pope Sylvester II	991	998
Roger de Blois		998	1005
Francon		1005	1015
Arnoul	Archbishop of Tours	1018	
Baudouin		1030	circa 1059
Gervais de Château-du-Loir	Bishop of Le Mans	1059	1067
Pierre de Loiselève		1067	1073
Guillaume		1073	
Roger II	Bishop of Beauvais	1074	1080
Geoffroy de Boulogne	Bishop of Paris	1074	1085
Gilbert		1085	1090
Ourson or Ursion	Bishop of Senlis	1090	
Hubert	Bishop of Senlis	1091	1092
Gilbert		1094	1106
Étienne de Senlis	Bishop of Paris	1106	1118
Étienne de Garlande		1118	1127
Simon		1127	1132
Étienne de Garlande		1132	1137
Algrin		1137	1140
Noël	abbot of Rebais	1140	
Cadurc		1140	1147
Barthélemy		1147	1149
Simon		1150	
Hugues de Champfleury	Bishop of Soissons	1150	1172
Hugues du Puiset		1179	1185
Guérin	monk and Bishop of Senlis	1203	1227
Philippe d'Antogny		1227	1231
Aubry Cornu		1231	1236
Jean de la Cour		1236	1244
Nicolas Le Chien		1244	1249
Nicolas Larcat	Archbishop of Tyros	1249	1252
Raoul de Grosparmy		1252	1259
Guy Faucoi	later Pope Clement IV	before 1260	
Simon de Brie	later Pope Martin IV	1259	1261
Philippe de Cahors	Prior of Saint-Frambaud de Senlis	1262	1270
Guillaume de Rampillon	Archdeacon of Paris	1270	
Guillaume de Chartres	Dominican friar	1270	
Pierre Barbet		1271	1273
Henri de Vézélay		1273	1282
Pierre Chalon		1282	1290
Jean de Vassoigne		1291	1292
Guillaume de Crépy		1293	1296
Thibaut de Pouancé	Bishop of Dol	1296	1297
Pierre Flote	knight	1297	1302
Étienne de Suizy		1302	1304
Pierre de Mornay	Bishop of Auxerre	1304	1306
Pierre de Grez		1306	
Pierre de Belleperche	Bishop of Auxerre	1306	1307
Guillaume de Nogaret	knight	1307	1310
Gilles I Aycelin de Montaigu	Archbishop of Narbonne	1310	1311
Guillaume de Nogaret		1311	1313
Pierre de Latilly	Bishop of Châlons	1313	1314
Étienne de Mornay		1314	1316
Pierre d'Arrabloy		1316	
Pierre de Chappes		1317	1321
Jean de Cherchemont		1320	1321
Pierre Rodier		1321	1323
Jean de Cherchemont		1323	1328
Mathieu Ferrand		1328	1329
Jean de Marigny	Bishop of Beauvais	1329	
Guillaume de Saint-Maure		1329	1334
Roger	Bishop of Arras, later Pope Clement VI	1334	
Guy Baudet	bishop of Langres	1335	1338
Étienne de Vissac	knight	1338	1339
Guillaume Flote		1339	1347
Firmin de Coquerel	Bishop of Noyon	1347	1349
Pierre de la Forest	Archbishop of Rouen	1349	1357
Gilles Aycelin de Montaigut	Bishop of Thérouanne	1357	1358
Foulques Bardoul	Bishop of Avranches	1357	1359
Jean de Dormans	Bishop of Lisieux	1358	
Pierre de la Forest	cardinal, Archbishop of Rouen	1359	1361
Gilles Aycelin de Montaigut	Bishop of Thérouanne	1361	
Jean de Dormans	Bishop of Beauvais	18 September 1361	1372
Guillaume de Dormans		1372	1373
Jean de Dormans		1373	
Pierre d'Orgemont	First President of the Parlement of Paris	20 November 1373	1380
Miles de Dormans	Bishop of Beauvais	October 1380	1383
Pierre de Giac		1383	December 1388
Arnaud de Corbie		December 1388	1398
Nicolas du Bosc	Bishop of Bayeux	1398	1400
Arnaud de Corbie		1400	1405
Jean de Montagu	Archbishop of Sens	1405	1413
Arnaud de Corbie		1409	8 August 1413
Eustache de Laistre		1413	
Henri de Marie		August 1413	29 May 1418
Robert le Maçon		1418	
Eustache de Laistre		1418	1420
Robert le Maçon		1419	1421
Jean Le Clerc	Burgundian party.	1420	1424
Martin Gouge	Bishop of Clermont, Charles VII's faction	1421	1425
Lewis of Luxembourg	Bishop of Thérouanne, Burgundian party	1424	1435
Renault de Chartres	Archbishop of Reims, Charles VII's faction	1425	1445
Guillaume Jouvenel des Ursins		1445	1461
Pierre de Morvilliers		1461	1465
Guillaume Jouvenel des Ursins		1465	1472
Pierre Doriole		1472	1483
Guillaume de Rochefort		1483	12 August 1492
Adam Fumée		1492	November 1494
Robert Briçonnet	Archbishop of Reims	August 1495	1497
Guy de Rochefort		1497	1507/1508
Jean de Ganay		1508	1512
Antoine Duprat	Cardinal, Archbishop of Sens and Bishop of Albi	1515	1535
Antoine du Bourg		1535	1538
Guillaume Poyet		1538	1545
François Olivier		1545	1560
Michel de l'Hôpital		1560	1573
René de Birague	Cardinal	1573	1583
Philippe Hurault, comte de Cheverny		1583	1599
Pomponne de Bellièvre		2 August 1599	9 September 1607
Nicolas Brûlart de Sillery		10 September 1607	1 October 1624
Étienne I d'Aligre		3 October 1624	11 December 1635
Pierre Séguier		19 December 1635	28 January 1672
Étienne II d'Aligre		8 January 1674	28 October 1677
Michel Le Tellier		29 October 1677	30 October 1685
Louis Boucherat	Count of Compans	1 November 1685	2 September 1699
Louis Phélypeaux	Comte de Pontchartrain	5 September 1699	1 July 1714
Daniel Voysin de La Noiraye		2 July 1714	2 February 1717
Henri François d'Aguesseau		3 February 1717	27 October 1750
Guillaume de Lamoignon de Blancmesnil		10 December 1750	14 September 1768
René Charles de Maupeou		15 September 1768	16 September 1768
René Nicolas de Maupeou		16 September 1768	1 July 1790

== Keepers of the Seals, 1699–1790 ==
Keeper of the Seals	Begin	End
Louis Phélypeaux, Comte de Pontchartrain	5 September 1699	1 July 1714
Daniel Voysin de La Noiraye	2 July 1714	2 February 1717
Henri François d'Aguesseau	3 February 1717	28 January 1718
Marc René de Voyer de Paulmy, Marquis d'Argenson	28 January 1718	7 June 1720
Henri François d'Aguesseau	8 June 1720	28 February 1722
Joseph Jean Baptiste Fleuriau d'Armenonville	28 February 1722	17 August 1727
Germain Louis Chauvelin	23 August 1727	20 February 1737
Henri François d'Aguesseau	20 February 1737	27 November 1750
Jean-Baptiste de Machault d'Arnouville	27 November 1750	1 February 1757
vacant	1 February 1757	13 October 1761
Nicolas René Berryer	13 October 1761	15 September 1762
Paul Esprit Feydeau de Brou	27 September 1762	3 October 1763
René Charles de Maupeou	3 October 1763	18 September 1768
René Nicolas Charles Augustin de Maupeou	18 September 1768	24 August 1774
Armand Thomas Hue de Miromesnil	24 August 1774	8 April 1787
Chrétien François de Lamoignon de Basville	8 April 1787	14 September 1788
Charles Louis François de Paule de Barentin	17 September 1788	3 August 1789
Jérôme Champion de Cicé	4 August 1789	21 November 1790

== See also ==
- Royal household under the Merovingians and Carolingians
