= Miles de Dormans =

French prelate

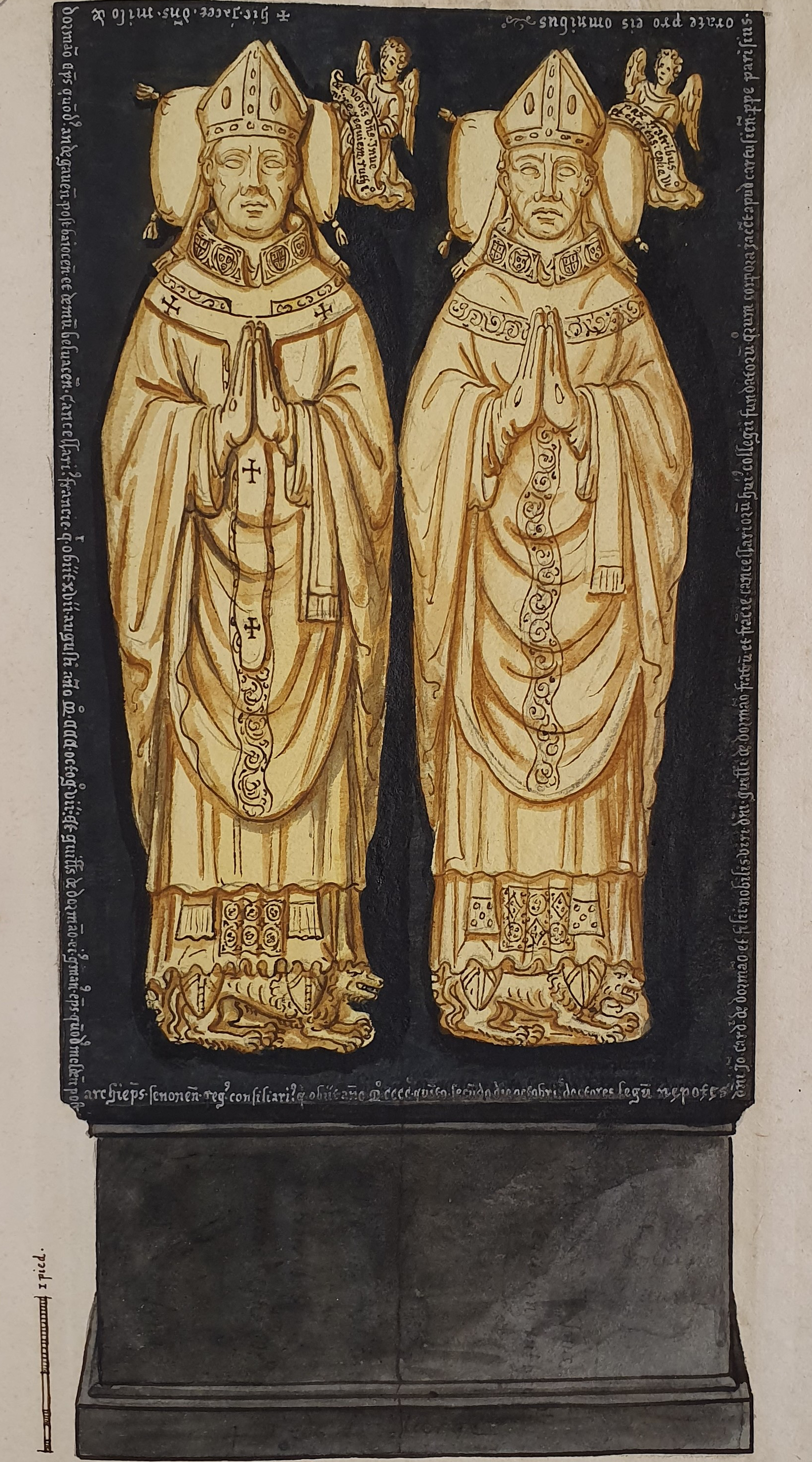
Tomb of Miles de Dormans, chancellor of France, and his brother Guillaume de Dormans, archbishop of Sens, in the Collège de Beauvais in Paris

Miles (or Milon) de Dormans (c. 1343 – 17 August 1387) was a French prelate, bishop and Chancellor of France in 1380.

== Biography ==
He was the son of Guillaume de Dormans, Chancellor of France, a nephew of Cardinal Jean de Dormans and the brother of Guillaume de Dormans, the Archbishop of Sens (1343-1387).

While he was professor utrius juris (civil law and canon law) at the University of Orléans, he was appointed bishop of Angers in 1371. He was then appointed bishop of Bayeux on 16 June 1374 and subsequently bishop of Beauvais on 31 January 1375.

He was appointed Chancellor of France on 1 October 1380.

He died on 17 August 1387.
