= Jean de Cherchemont =

Chancellor of France (died 1328)

Jean de Cherchemont (died 1328) was Chancellor of France during the reigns of Philip V of France, Charles IV of France and Philip VI of France.

This covered two periods, 1321 to 1322, and 1323 to 1328.

He appears in The Accursed Kings. He was played by Daniel Gall in the 1972 miniseries and Mircea Stohan in the 2005 miniseries.
