= Jean de Ganay =

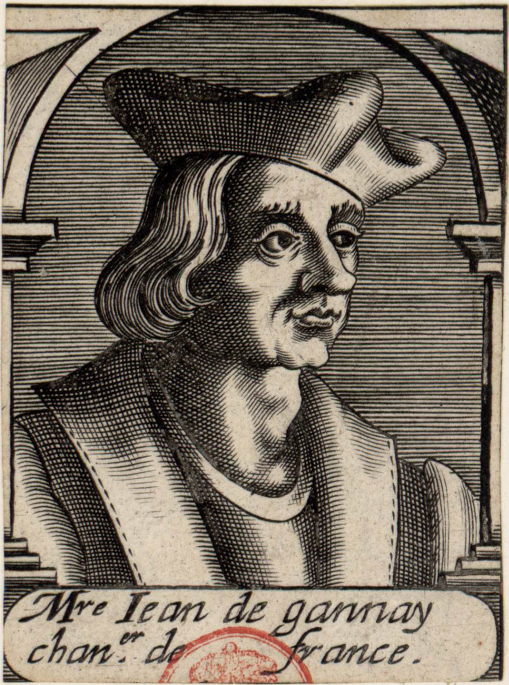

Jean de Ganay (1455–1512) was an ambassador and chancellor of the Kingdom of Naples under Charles VIII and Chancellor of France under Louis XII.

== Family ==
He belonged to a family originally from Nivernais that was established in Burgundy in the 15th century.

His grandfather was Guichard de Ganay, lord of Savigny and advisor to Duke Philip the Good of Burgundy. He was also judiciary of the County of Charolais and a knight of Burgundy. His father Guillaume served in the same capacity until 1480.

His brother Germain de Ganay (d.1520) was a clerical advisor to the Parlement of Paris in 1485 and Dean of Beauvais Cathedral.

== Biography ==
Jean de Ganay was lord of Persan and La Bussière.

He was first a lawyer at the Parlement of Paris in 1478 and then as an advisor to the Court of Aids in October 1481. He also attended the Parlement of Paris in 1490.

Jean de Ganay advised King Charles VIII to conquer the Kingdom of Naples, asserting his rights that the last princes of the House of Anjou had bequeathed it to his family. The King sent de Ganay and Louis de la Trémoille as ambassadors to Pope Alexander VI.

On the death of King Ferdinand I of Naples in 1494, Charles VIII claimed the titles of King of Naples and Jerusalem and entered Italy. This was the start of the First Italian War.

Despite early successes, the intervention of Pope Alexander VI and Ferdinand II of Aragon resulted in the defeat of Charles VIII and the end of the War in 1497.

King Louis XII of France appointed de Ganay as President of the Parlement of Paris in 1505 and as Chancellor of France in 1507.

In September 1510, de Ganay presided over the Council of Tours which attempted to mediate a peace between Louis XII of France and Pope Julius II in the wake of the War of the League of Cambrai.

== Death ==
Jean de Ganay died in Blois in May 1512 and was buried in the chapel of Saint Merry in Paris. He had no children with his wife Jeanne Boilesve.
