= René Charles de Maupeou =

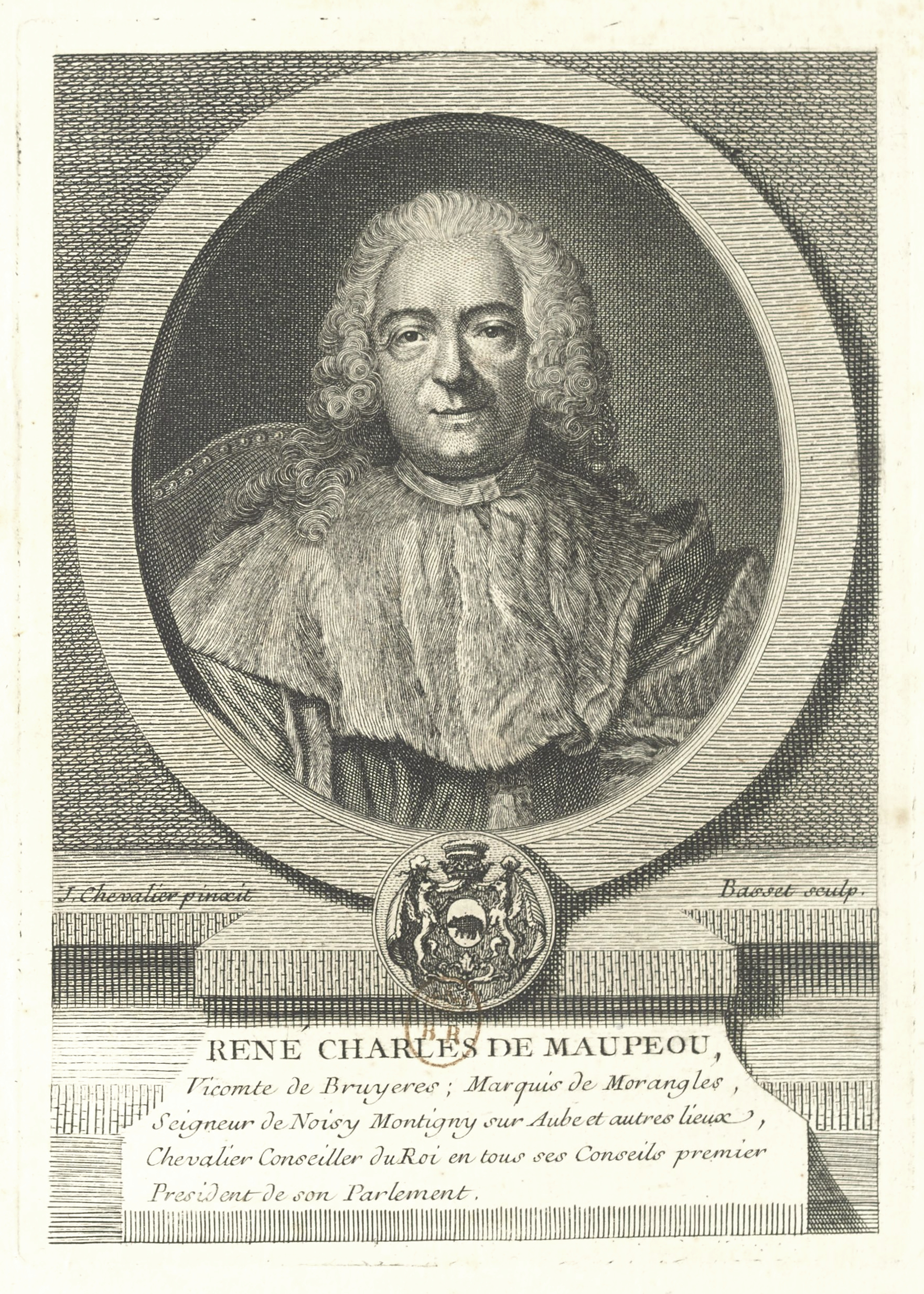
René Charles de Maupeou

René Charles de Maupeou (11 June 1688 – 4 April 1775) was a French politician, and chancellor of France during King Louis XV's reign.

== Biography ==
He was born in Paris on 11 June 1688 to a family ennobled in the sixteenth century as noblesse de robe : the house of Maupeou. He died on 4 April 1775.

He is the father of René Nicolas Charles Augustin de Maupeou.
