= Antoine du Bourg =

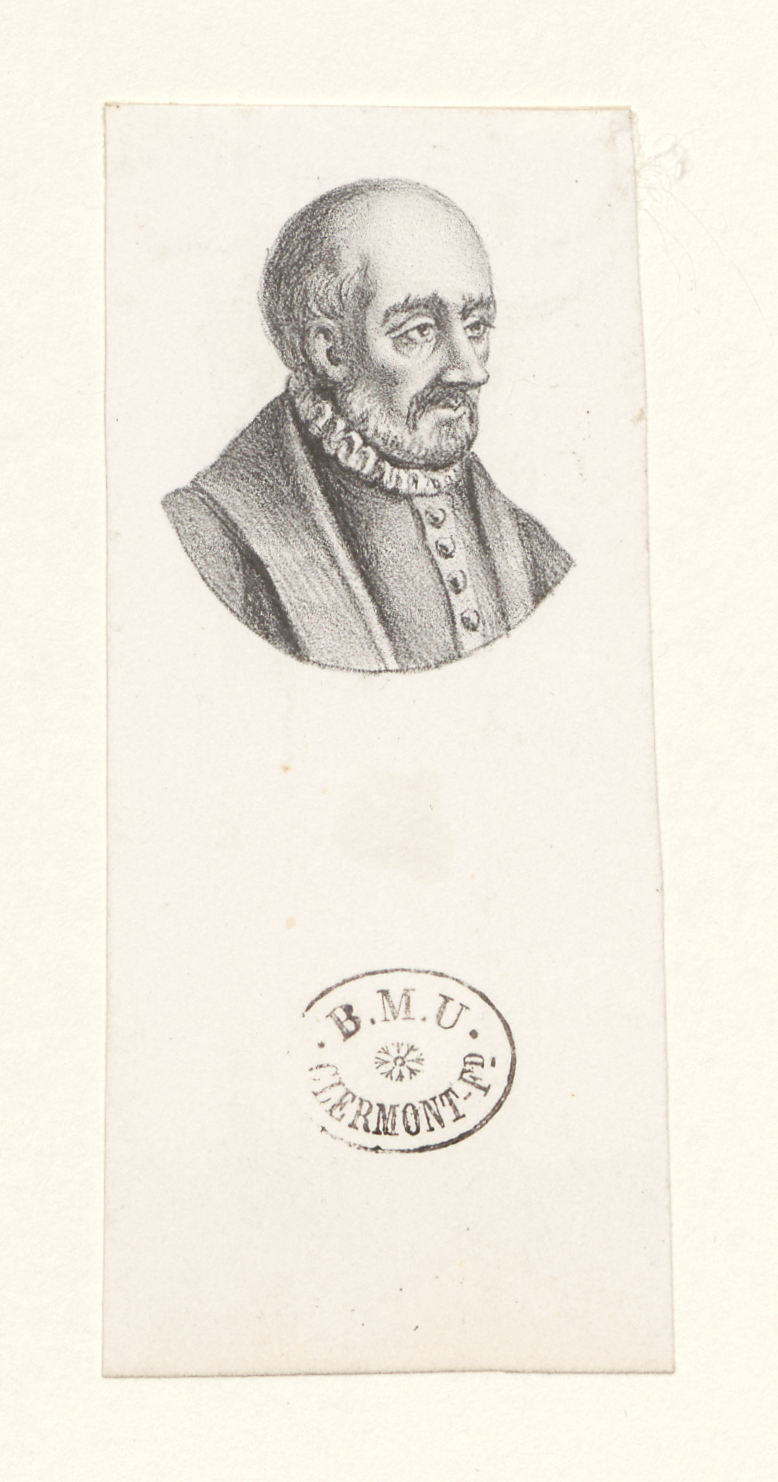

Antoine du Bourg (1490–1538) was Chancellor of France under Francis I of France.

== Biography ==
Antoine du Bourg was born into a minor noble family in Auvergne.

His career as a magistrate in the service of the French Monarchy began in 1526 when he became civil lieutenant at the Châtelet of Paris, and then Master of Requests in 1532 before presiding over the Parlement of Paris in 1534.

On 16 July 1535, du Bourg was appointed Chancellor of France upon the death of his mentor, Antoine du Prat, an office he held until his accidental death on 28 October 1538, when he accompanied Francis I to Laon, where he was fatally knocked off his mule into the crowd.

On the day of his appointment to the Chancellory, he issued the Edict of Coucy and later issued the Edicts of Joinville and Is-sur-Tille.

Louis Caillaud, an official of the Parlement of Paris asked du Bourg for authorization to print a French edition of the Great Bible used by Henry VIII of England.

== Issue ==
From his marriage with Anne or Jeanne Hersend he had:

- François du Bourg
- Jean-Baptiste du Bourg
