= Antoine Marcourt =

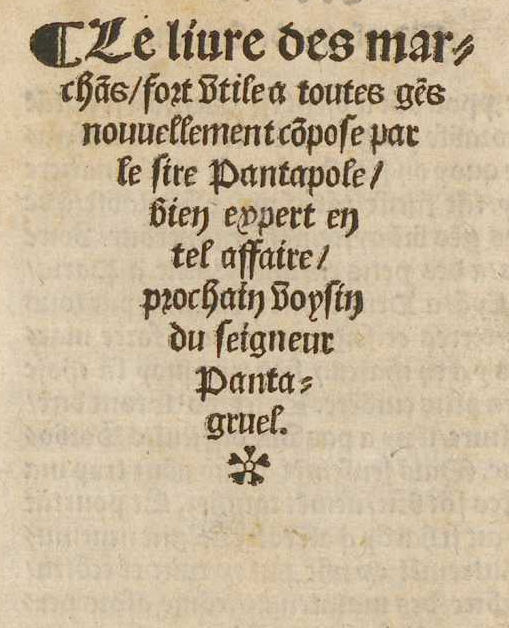
Le livre des marchans by Antoine Marcourt, 1533.

Antoine Marcourt was a Protestant pastor of the 16th century. He was from the French region of Picardy, and became the first pastor of Neuchâtel.

In 1533, he published a satirical work about Catholic practices, such as the cult of Saints and pilgrimages, entitled Le livre des Marchans, in a style reminiscent of Gargantua and Pantagruel. He used the penname "Pantople". The work was published by Pierre de Vingle, who was also to publish the first Bible in French in 1535, called the Bible d'Olivetan.

He was the protagonist of the "Affair of the Placards", on the night of 17 October 1534, in which notices appeared on the streets of Paris and other major cities denouncing Mass. A notice was even posted on the door to the king's room, and, it is said, the box in which he kept his handkerchief. Marcourt was responsible for the notices.

On 13 January 1535 Marcourt again published a pamphlet entitled Petit traité très utile et salutaire de la saincte eucharistie de nostre Seigneur Jesus christ, "Little Treatise, Very Useful and Salutary, on the Holy Eucharist of Our Lord Jesus Christ."

These publications and notices led the king, Francis I, to take a progressively stronger stance against Protestantism and other diversions from the Roman Catholic faith. On 29 January 1535, an Edict was issued taking disposition against Protestants, with a more moderate approach being then taken with the Edict of Coucy on 16 July. A stronger and general Edict would order the extirpation of heresy from the kingdom on 24 June 1539. The Edict of Fontainebleau on 1 June 1540 would give authority to regional parliaments, rather than religious courts in fighting against Protestantism. Things would ultimately worsen much more for Protestants in France, as in the Massacre of Mérindol in 1545.

== Works ==
- Le livre des marchans, fort utile à toutes gens; nouvellement composé par le sire Pantople, bien expert en tel affaire, prochain voisin du seigneur Pantagruel, 1533
- Articles véritables sur les horribles, grandz et importables abuz de la Messe papalle: inventee directement contre la saincte Cene de Jesus Christ, 1534
- Déclaration de la messe, Le fruict dicelle, La cause, et le moyen, pourquoy et comment on la doibt maintenir, 1534 (A declaration of the Masse: the fruyte thereof, the cause & the meane, wherfore and howe it oughte to be maynteyned, 1548 )
- Petit traité très utile et salutaire de la saincte eucharistie de nostre Seigneur Jesuschrist, 1535
