= René Nicolas Charles Augustin de Maupeou =

French noble, lawyer and statesman (1714–1792)

René Nicolas de Maupeou
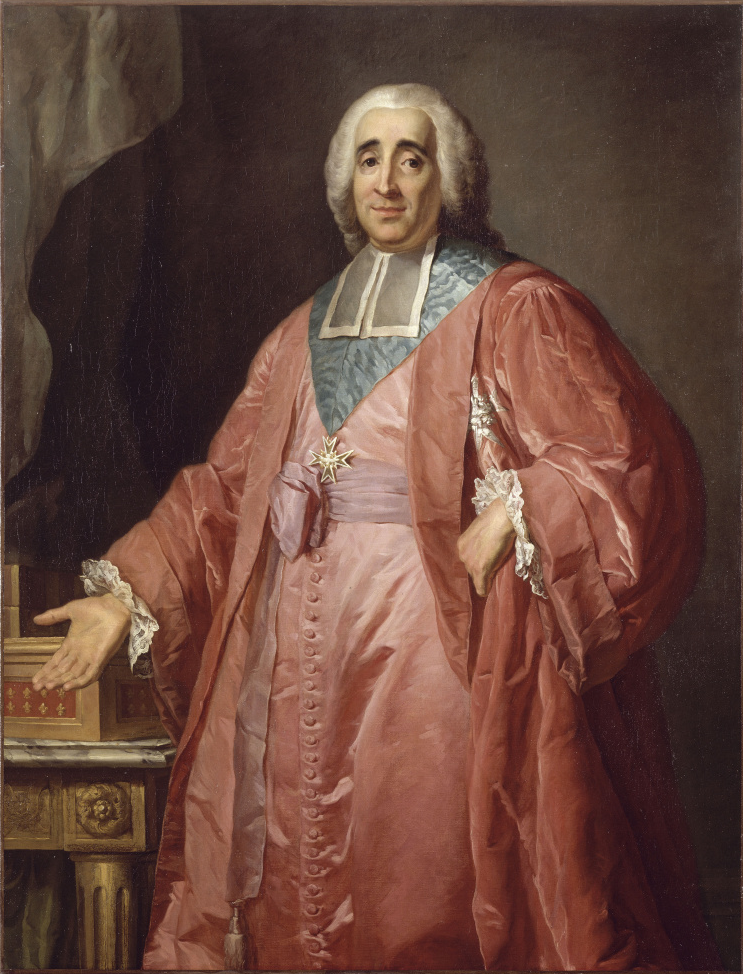
- Portrait by Pierre Lacour

Chancellor of France
- In office 16 September 1768 – 1 July 1790
- Preceded by: René Charles de Maupeou

First president of the parlement of Paris
- In office 12 October 1763 – 15 September 1768
- Preceded by: Mathieu-François Molé
- Succeeded by: Étienne François d'Aligre

Personal details
- Born: 25 February 1714 Montpellier, France
- Died: 29 July 1792 (aged 78) Le Thuit, France
- Party: Bourbon Crown
- Profession: Statesman, magistrate
- Chief Minister of France: ← Duke of Choiseul; Turgot →

René Nicolas Charles Augustin de Maupeou, marquis de Morangles (French: [ʁəne nikɔla də mopu]; 25 February 1714 – 29 July 1792) was a French lawyer, politician, and chancellor of France, whose attempts at reform signalled the failure of enlightened despotism in France. He is best known for his effort to destroy the system of parlements, which were powerful regional courts, in 1770–74. When King Louis XV died in 1774, the parlements were restored and Maupeou lost power.

== Early life ==
He was born in Montpellier to a family ennobled in the sixteenth century as noblesse de robe, the eldest son of René Charles de Maupeou (1688–1775), who was president of the parlement of Paris from 1743 to 1757.

In 1744 he married a rich heiress, Anne de Roncherolles (1725–1752), a cousin of Madame d'Épinay, the friend of Rousseau who moved in the circles of the Philosophes. Entering public life, he was his father's right hand in the conflicts between the parlement and Christophe de Beaumont, archbishop of Paris, who was supported by the court. Between 1763 and 1768, dates which cover the revision of the Calas case that Voltaire had championed and the trial of the comte de Lally, Maupeou was himself president of the parlement. In 1768, he became chancellor in succession to his father, who had held the office for twenty-four hours only, largely in order to permit him to retire with the prestigious title. With the disgrace of Choiseul, 24 December 1770, Maupeou was the chief minister.

He determined to support the royal authority against the parlement, the perennial block to reforms of the tax farming system or the privileges of the propertied classes, which in league with the provincial magistratures was seeking to arrogate to itself the functions of the states-general. He allied himself with the duc d'Aiguillon and the king's mistress Madame du Barry, and secured for a creature of his own, the Abbé Terray, the office of comptroller-general. The struggle erupted over the trial of the case of the duc d'Aiguillon, ex-governor of Brittany, and of La Chalotais, procureur-général of the province, who had been imprisoned by the governor for accusations against his administration.

When the parlement showed signs of hostility against Aiguillon, Maupeou read letters patent from Louis XV annulling the proceedings. Louis replied to remonstrances from the parlement by a lit de justice, in which he demanded the surrender of the procedural minutes. On 27 November 1770 appeared the Édit de règlement et de discipline, which was promulgated by the chancellor, forbidding the union of the various branches of the parlement and correspondence with the provincial magistratures. It also made a strike on the part of the parlement punishable by confiscation of goods, and forbade further obstruction to the registration of royal decrees after the royal reply had been given to a first remonstrance. This edict the magistrates refused to register, and it was registered in a lit de justice held at Versailles on 7 December, whereupon the parlement was suspended in its functions.

== Coup ==
After five summonses to return to their duties, the magistrates were surprised individually on the night of 19 January 1771 by musketeers, who required them to sign yes or no to a further request to return. Thirty-eight magistrates gave an affirmative answer, but on the exile of their former colleagues by lettres de cachet, they retracted and were also exiled. Maupeou installed the council of state to administer justice pending the establishment of six superior courts in the provinces and of a new parlement in Paris, in which the magistrature would no longer be a hereditary prerogative but become salaried officials appointed by the Crown. The cour des aides was next suppressed. Maupeou proposed to make the judicial system more uniform throughout the country, which was a patchwork of local judicatures.

Voltaire praised this revolution, applauding the suppression of the old hereditary magistracy, but for the aristocrats and the noblesse de robe Maupeou's policy was regarded as the triumph of tyranny. The remonstrances of the princes, of the nobles, and of the minor courts, were met by exile and suppression, but by the end of 1771, the new system of the parlements de Maupeou was established, and the Bar, which had offered a passive resistance, recommenced to plead. A renewed attempt was made to tax the privileged and exempted groups. But it was not merely the death of Louis XV in May 1774 that ruined the chancellor: Durand Echeverria characterized the dismissal of Maupeou as "the inevitable liquidation of an exhausted expedient".

== Fall ==
The immediate restoration of the parlements by Louis XVI was followed by a renewal of the quarrels between the new king and the magistrature. Maupeou and Terray were replaced on 24 August 1774 by Miromesnil and then by Malesherbes, recalled from his exile in 1775 to be Secretary of State of the Maison du Roi, and by the economist Turgot. Maupeou is said to have remarked, "I had won for the king a case that has lasted three hundred years. He wishes to lose it again; he is the master of it."

Maupeou lived in retreat, still holding the office of Chancellor (abolished 1 July 1790) until his death at Thuit (Eure) in 1792, having lived to see the overthrow of the ancien régime. His work, in so far as it was directed towards the separation of the judicial and political functions and to the reform of the abuses attaching to a hereditary magistrature, was subsequently endorsed by the Revolution. He had aimed at securing absolute power for Louis XV, but his intrigues and the violence of his judicial actions were in reality a serious blow to the monarchy. "By pressing the issue of sovereignty to an ultimate confrontation in this way," remarks Keith Michael Baker of Maupeou's staffing his remodelled courts with men willing to exercise judicial functions within limits imposed by the royal will, "he undermined in practice exactly that belief in a constitutional middle ground between liberty and despotism that Guillaume-Joseph Saige had been concerned to deny in theory".

== Issue ==
He had two sons:

1. René Ange Augustin de Maupeou (1746–1794), who became maître de camp of the Royal-Burgundy cavalry regiment.
2. Charles Victor René de Maupeou (1749–1789), who became maître des requêtes.

== See also ==
- Maupeou Family
