= Martin Gouge =

French chancellor

Martin Gouge (c. 1360 – 25 November 1444), surnamed De Charpaigne, was a French chancellor.

He was born at Bourges about 1360. A canon of Bourges, in 1402 he became treasurer to John, duke of Berry, and in 1406 bishop of Chartres. He was arrested by John the Fearless, Duke of Burgundy, with the hapless Jean de Montaigu (1349-1409) in 1409, but was soon released and then banished. Attaching himself to Louis, the Dauphin of France, he became his chancellor, the king's ambassador in Brittany, and a member of the grand council; and on 13 May 1415 he was transferred from the see of Chartres to the see of Clermont-Ferrand.

In May 1418, when the Burgundians re-entered Paris, he only escaped death at their hands by taking refuge in the Bastille. He then left Paris, but only to fall into the hands of his enemy, the Georges de la Trémoille, who imprisoned him in the castle of Sully. Rescued by the dauphin Charles, he was appointed chancellor of France on 3 February 1422.

He endeavoured to reconcile Burgundy and France, was a party to the selection of Arthur, earl of Richmond, as constable, but had to resign his chancellorship in favour of Regnault of Chartres; first from 25 March to 6 August 1425, and again when La Trémoille had supplanted Richmond. After the fall of La Trémoille in 1433 he returned to court, and exercised a powerful influence over affairs of state almost till his death, which took place at the castle of Beaulieu (Puy-de-Dôme) on 25 or 26 November 1444.

== Sources ==
- Hiver's account in the Mémoires de la Société des Antiquaires du Centre, p. 267 (1869);
- Nouvelle Biographie générale.
