= Guillaume Jouvenel des Ursins =

15th-century Chancellor of France

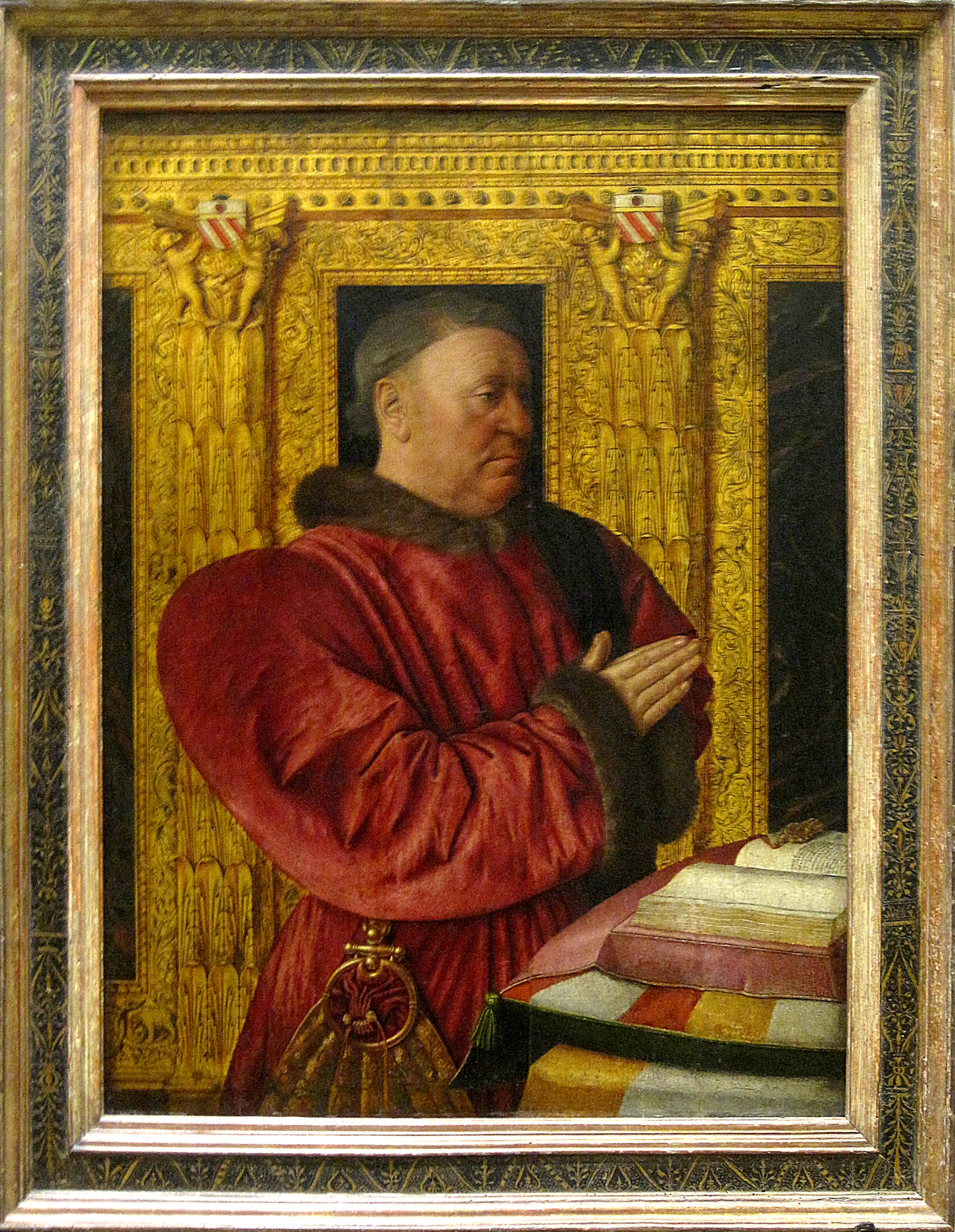
Guillaume Jouvenel des Ursins, by Jean Fouquet, Musée du Louvre, Paris.

Guillaume Jouvenel des Ursins (15 March 1400 - 23 June 1472) was Chancellor of France from 1445 to 1461 and from 1465 to 1472, under Charles VII and Louis XI of France respectively.

== See also ==
- List of Justice Ministers of France
