= Charles Dambray =

French official of the Bourbon Restoration

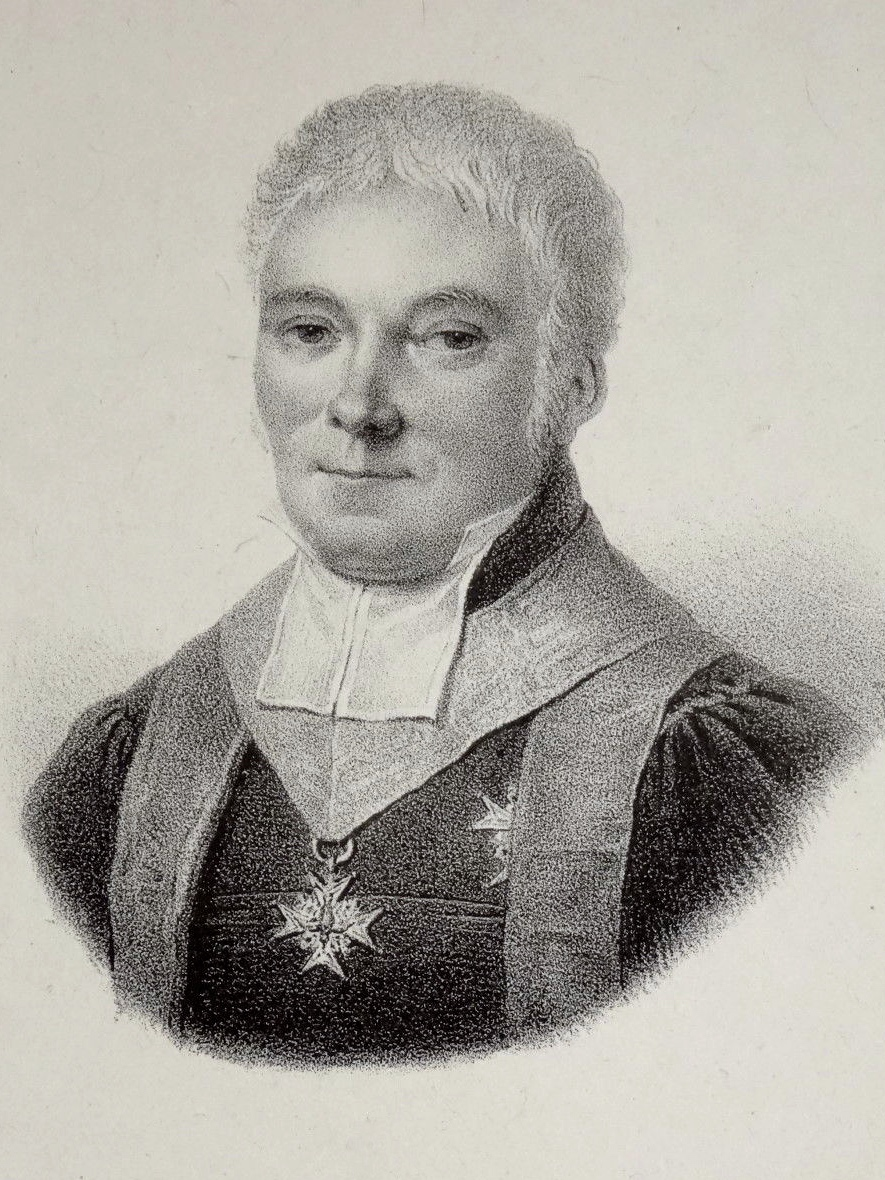
Portrait of Dambray

Charles-Henri, chevalier Dambray (9 October 1760, Rouen – 13 December 1829) was chancellor of France, minister of justice, and president of the chamber of peers during the short lived restored French Royalist government of 1814 and 1815.

== Biography ==
Charles Dambray was born in Normandy in 1760. In 1779, he was nominated advocate-general of the court des Aides, of Paris, and in the year 1788, was destined to fill the place of the aged Séguier, in the parliament of Paris. Dambray was a very zealous supporter of the faction des Ténèbres, and was compelled to leave France; but he soon returned, living in quite retirement and obscurity in Normandy, until the elevation of Napoleon Bonaparte to Emperor. Dambray afterwards became a member of the council-general of the department of the Lower Seine, and a humble panegyrist of the imperial government; while, however, he lavished praises on the Emperor, he kept up a constant correspondence with the French princes who had taken refuge in London. In recompense of these, his secret services, Louis XVIII nominated him in 1814, chancellor of France, minister of justice, and president of the chamber of peers.

Dambray had the merit of suggesting to Louis XVIII the ingenious idea of dating his decrees from the 19th year of his reign; he meditated certain innovations of the most absurd and extravagant kind, which, happily, the king and circumstances did not permit him to carry into effect. As the government, was dispersed in the twinkling of an eye, by the intelligence that the Napoleon Bonaparte had returned to France from exile on Elba and was marching rapidly upon Paris. Dupont remained in France, probably with the intention of trying to procure a reconciliation with Napoleon; while his colleagues all fled to Ghent with the rest of the Royal court.

After Louis XVIII was reinstated for a second time on the throne of France, Dambray was replaced by Étienne-Denis Pasquier. In 1816 Dambray was nominated keeper of the seals, ad interim.
