= Chrétien François de Lamoignon de Bâville =

French statesman and magistrate (1735–1789)

Chrétien François de Lamoignon, marquis de Bâville, also written as Chrétien François de Lamoignon de Basville (1735 – 1789) was a French statesman and magistrate.

Lamoignon was the Keeper of the Seals of France from 8 April 1787 to 14 September 1788. In this position, he was responsible for issuing the Edict of Versailles in 1787, which granted civil status and freedom of worship to France's Protestants, and for the abolition of judicial torture. He was one of the assistants of Loménie de Brienne, whose unpopularity and fall he shared.

In 1789, he was found dead in his home, possibly by suicide.
