= Affair of the Placards =

1534 anti-Catholic protest in France

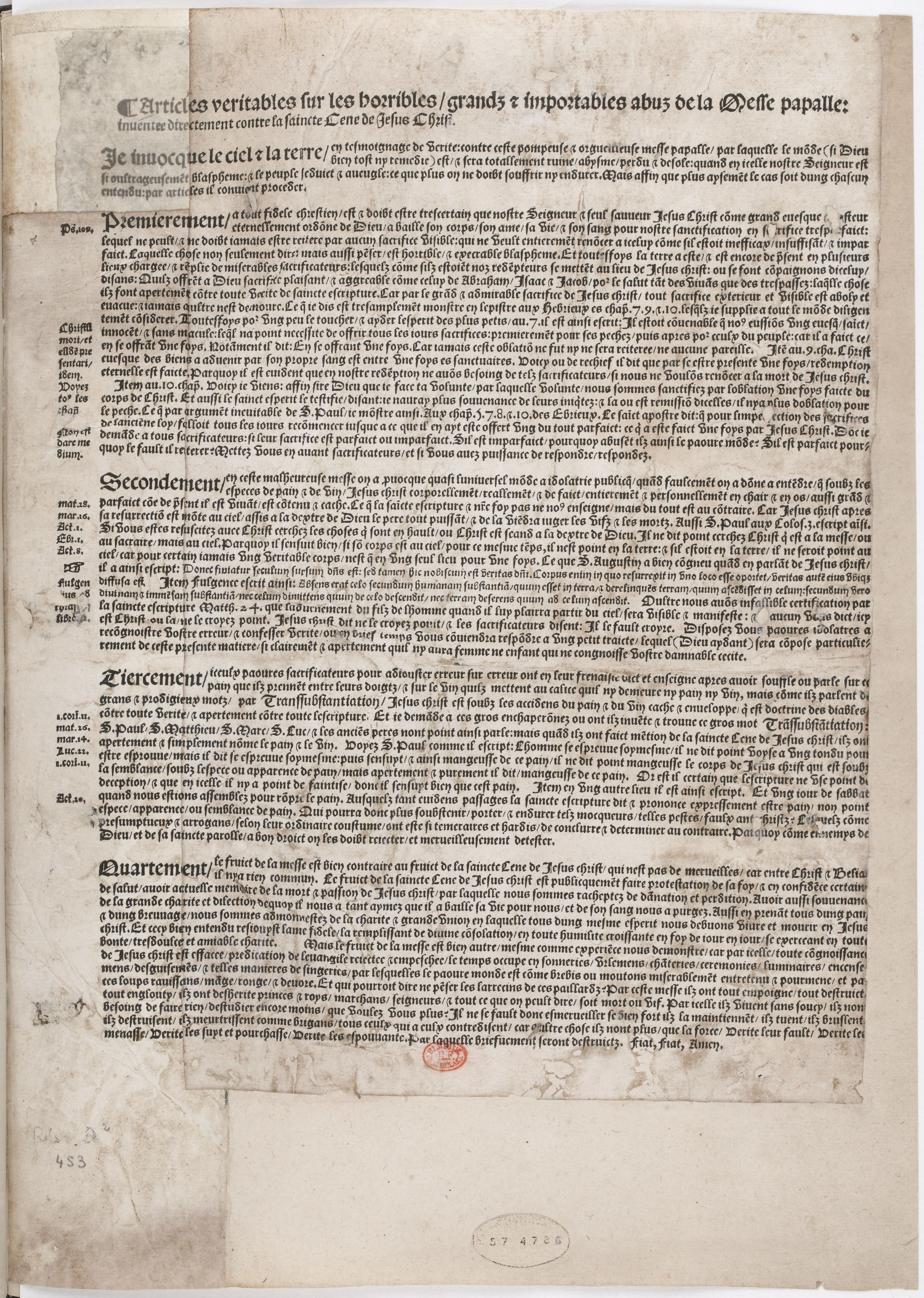
An example of the placards in the Bibliothèque nationale de France in Paris.

The Affair of the Placards (French: Affaire des Placards) was an incident in which anti-Catholic posters appeared in public places in Paris and in four major provincial cities, Blois, Rouen, Tours and Orléans, in the night of the 17 to 18 October 1534. One of the posters was posted on the bedchamber door of King Francis I at Amboise, an affront and a breach of security that left him shaken. The Affaire des Placards brought an end to the conciliatory policies of Francis, which had formerly attempted to protect the Protestants from the more extreme measures of the Parlement de Paris, and also of the public entreaties for moderation of Philip Melanchthon.

== The placards ==
The placards carried the title "Genuine articles on the horrific, great and unbearable abuses of the papal mass, invented directly contrary to the Holy Supper of our Lord, sole mediator and sole savior Jesus Christ.". (Note: "Articles véritables sur les horribles, grans et importables abuz de la messe papale, inventée directement contre la Sainte Cène de notre Seigneur, seul médiateur et seul Sauveur Jésus-Christ".) This provocative title was a direct attack on Catholic conceptions of the Eucharist. The text supported Zwingli's position on the Mass which denied the Real presence of Christ in the Eucharist.

The individual who has been traditionally credited as the chief inspiration, if not the direct author, of the placards, was the French Protestant leader Guillaume Farel, but it seems probable that Antoine de Marcourt, a pastor of Neuchâtel from Picardy, was the real author: Antoine Froment averred that "these placards were made at Neuchâtel in Switzerland by a certain Antoine Marcourd". Writing anonymously the following month, Marcourt took credit for the placards in the address to benevolent readers of his anonymous "Most useful and salutary little treatise of the holy Eucharist", published at Neuchâtel, 16 November 1534, in which he avers "I have been moved by true affection to compose and edit in writing some true Articles on the unbearable abuses of the Mass. Which Articles I wish to be published and posted throughout the public places of the land..." (Note: "j'ai esté esmeu par bonne affection de composer et rédiger en escript aucuns Articles véritables sur les importables abuz de la Messe. Lesquels Articles je desire estre publiéz et attachéz par tous les lieux publicques de la terre...")

== Aftermath ==
Processions were announced in all the parishes of Paris for the following Sunday. In Paris, the King himself stood under the canopy where the Most Holy Eucharist was usually carried, making a clear political statement.

In addition, a reward of a hundred écus was advertised for information leading to the arrest of the perpetrator or perpetrators, who were to be burned at the stake. Protestant sympathizers were soon identified and sent to the Châtelet. The first condemnations were pronounced 10 November 1534; the first of those burned at the stake, on 13 November, was a cripple named Barthélemi Milon.

The polemic against the Catholic Church was considered a severe insult to Catholics, and the King now publicly affirmed his Catholic faith. The immediate public outcry necessitated the flight of several prominent Protestant leaders, including John Calvin, and of scholars and poets like Clément Marot.

In another provocative action on 13 January 1535, when François had recently returned to Paris, broadsheets of a tract on the Sacraments were deposited in the streets and doorways of Paris. Later, printing was banned by royal decree.

Anyone caught in possession or distribution of placards, libelles, or books on the forbidden topic would be charged and prosecuted simply by association with the forbidden print. The king’s ban had in effect made heresy equivalent to political disobedience in the form of literary crimes. The Affair of the Placards had left no doubt about François I’s attitude towards French Protestantism, dissent, and orthodoxy. In the last seven years of his reign, repressive legislation flowed unabated and fueled the French religious crisis.

== Links ==
- Modernized text on French Wikisource
