= Provençal =

Provençal may refer to:

- Something of, from, or related to Provence, a region of France
  - Provençal dialect, a dialect of the Occitan language, spoken in the southeast of France
  - Provençal, meaning the whole Occitan language
- Provencal, Louisiana, a village in the United States
- Provençal, an alternative name for the Italian wine grape Dolcetto

== See also ==
- Jeu provençal, a French boules game
- Franco-Provençal, a distinct Romance language, which should not be confused with the Occitan language or with the Provençal dialect of the Occitan language
- Provence cuisine
- Provence wine
