= Edict of Fontainebleau (1540) =

1540 French decree enabling the persecution of Protestants

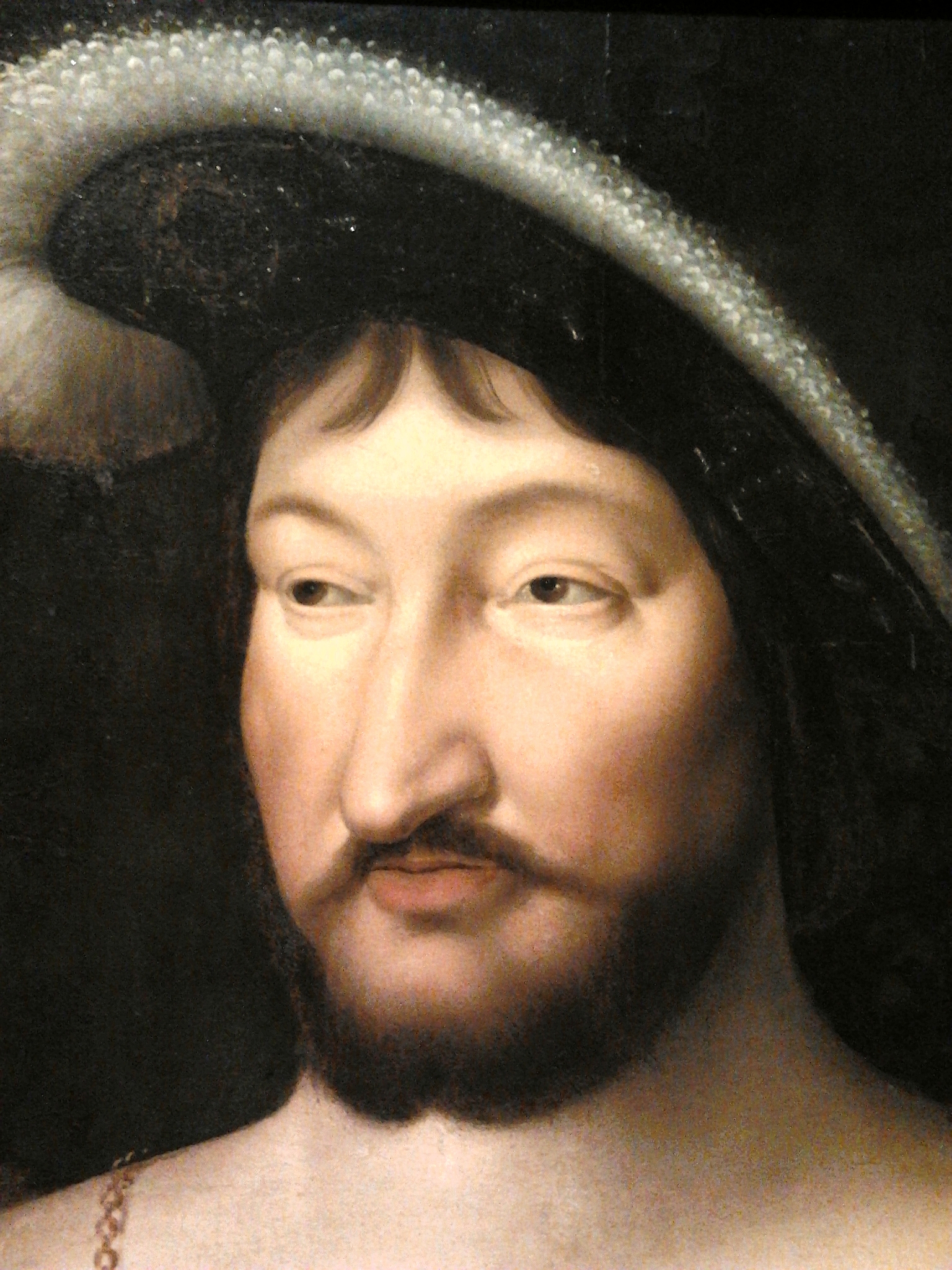
The French King Francis I

The Edict of Fontainebleau was issued 1 June 1540 by French King Francis I at his Palace of Fontainebleau. It occurred after the "Affair of the Placards" turned Francis I's policy from one of tolerance to persecution of Protestantism. The edict stated that the Protestant heresy was "high treason against God and mankind" and so deserved the appropriate punishments of torture, loss of property, public humiliation and death.

Thus, the Edict of Fontainebleau codified the persecution of the French Protestants, also called Huguenots, and was the first of many edicts in France to persecute them. The next major edict was the Edict of Châteaubriant, which was issued by Francis I's son, heir and the next king, Henry II.
