= Keeper of the Seals of France =

Official position in the Kingdom of France

Keeper of the Seals of France (French: Garde des sceaux de France) was an office of the French monarchy under the Ancien Régime. Its principal function was to supplement or assist the Chancellor of France. Its successor office under the Republic is the Keeper of the Seals, a title held by the Minister of Justice.

== List of Keepers of the Seals (1699–1790) ==
See List of Keepers of the Seals
