= Royal household under the Merovingians and Carolingians =

Household of the early kings of the Franks

The royal household of the early kings of the Franks is the subject of considerable discussion and remains controversial. This discussion is aimed at identifying the major categories of participants in the administration and those who made the major historical impacts. Every king of the Franks from Clovis I to Charles the Bald had a large cadre of advisors and bureaucrats that helped implement their regime. These supporters of the crown are frequently unknown, but often are ancestors of the later rulers of France. This is not intended to be a complete list of those supporting the kings but to serve as a guide for further study. A general discussion of the Merovingian and Carolingian dynasties can be found in the associated main articles. See also Government of the Carolingian Empire.

Mayor of the palace. Under the Merovingian kings, the mayor of the palace (maior palatii or “great man of the palace") was the manager of the household of the Frankish king. The office existed from the sixth century, and during the seventh it evolved into the power behind the throne. Some of the more significant mayors were:

- Pepin of Landen, mayor under Dagobert I and Sigebert III
- Grimoald the Elder, son of the previous
- Pepin of Heristal
- Charles Martel, son of the previous and father of the first of the Carolingian kings Pepin the Short, father of Charlemagne.

Counselors to the King. After the ascendance of the mayors of the palace to the heads of government, future kings understandingly did not place so much power in their underlings, but still relied on senior councillors (or counselors), mostly from the clergy. Major players included:

- Saint Fulrad, counselor to both Pepin the Short and Charlemagne
- Ebbo, Archbishop of Reims, counselor to Louis the Pious
- Adalard of Corbie, grandson of Charles Martel, played a key role in the rule of Louis the Pious
- Hincmar, Archbishop of Reims, principal advisor, friend, and chief propagandist for Charles the Bald.

Lord Chancellor. The officer of state responsible for the judiciary and was responsible for seeing that royal decrees were enrolled and registered by the sundry parlements, the provincial appellate courts. Some significant lord chancellors include:

- Saint Rémigius, Bishop of Reims and Apostle of the Franks
- Saint Romanus of Rouen, Bishop of Rouen
- Saint Ansbert, Bishop of Rouen
- Saint Audoin, Bishop of Rouen
- Saint Bonitus, Bishop of Auvergne
- Robert II, ancestor of the Robertians
- Fulrad, Abbot of St. Denis
- Alcuin, Abbot of Tours
- Fridgise, chancellor to Charlemagne, then to Louis the Pious
- Adalard the Seneschal
- Renaud de Vendôme, Bishop of Paris
- Gerbert d'Aurillac, later Pope Sylvester II.

See the main article Lord Chancellor of France.

Seneschal. The royal officer in charge of justice and control of the administration (in French, sénéchal). Some important seneschal were:

- Hugobert (under Theoderic III and his son Childebert III)
- Adalard the Seneschal (under Louis the Pious)

See the main article Seneschal.

Administrator of the Fisc. Also known as the Master of the Coin. The fisc was the system applied to the royal demesne which paid taxes from which the royal household was meant to be supported. The only recorded Administrator of the Fisc is:

- Engelram (under Charles the Bald), grandfather of Otto, Duke of Lorraine.

Master of the Doorkeepers. There is no real record of this function in France, although it was prominent in Hungary. The only known people with this title are:

- Count Engelram
- Boso of Provennce

Count Palatine. The Merovingian kings employed a high official, the Count Palatine (comes palatines) who at first assisted the king in his judicial duties and, at a later date, discharged many of these himself. Some notable Counts palatine were:

- Chrodobertus II
- Robert I, Count of Hesbaye
- Wigeric of Lotharingia.

See the main articles Count Palatine and Elector of the Palatinate.

Grafio. It is not clear what the duties of this position were, nor have any grafio been recorded other than in the charter of 28 February 693 of Clovis III.

Domesticus. Again mentioned in the charter of Clovis III, known people with this title include:

- Ansegisel, serving Sigebert III of Austrasia as duke and domesticus
- Dodo, father (or brother) of Alpaida, mistress of Pepin of Herstal, murdered by the family of Lambert of Maastricht.

Referendiary. Officers of the palace who made the report of the royal letters in the chancelleries in order to decide whether they should be signed and distributed. Some of the more significant refendiaries were:

- Saint Rémigius, Bishop of Reims
- Ansbert, Bishop of Rouen, in the court of Clothar II
- Robert I, Bishop of Tours, in the courts of Dagobert I and Clovis II
- Bonitus, Bishop of Auvergne, in the court of Sigebert III, King of Austrasia
- Robert II, in the court of Chlothar III.

See the main article Référendaire of France.

Grand Référendaire. Presumably, an officer responsible for multiple référendaire. The only known Grand Référendaire is:

- Audoin, Bishop of Rouen, Grand Référendaire of Dagobert I and Clovis II.

Magister Ostiariorum (Master of Porters). Directed the palace staff and controlled access to the king. The only known holder of this position is:

- Boso of Provence (Louis the Stammerer).

Chamberlain. In the late Middle Ages, the position of chamberlain (see Grand Chamberlain of France) was associated with the maintenance of the king’s chamber and his wardrobe. It is not clear that the early roles in this position were limited to this, as they were filled with powerful counts. Nevertheless, the following are known chamberlains from this period:

- Reginar (Rainier) (Louis the Pious), executed for plotting with Bernard of Italy against the crown
- Vivian (Charles the Bald)
- Engelram (Charles the Bald), ousted by Richilde in favor of her brother Boso
- Boso of Provence (Charles the Bald, Louis the Stammerer).

Missi Dominici. A final category of members of the court are the Missi Dominici (the palace inspectors), who travelled to the far reaches of the kingdom to promulgate royal doctrine. See the Capitulary of Servais for a listing of the bishops, abbots and counts that supported Charles the Bald in his attempts to manage the outlands, as well as the Capitularies of Charlemagne, and the Capitularies of Charles the Bald.

== Sources ==
Bury, J. B. (Editor), The Cambridge Medieval History, Volume II: The Rise of the Saracens and the Foundation of the Western Empire, Cambridge University Press, Cambridge, 1913

Bury, J. B. (Editor), The Cambridge Medieval History, Volume III: Germany and the Western Empire, Cambridge University Press, Cambridge, 1924

Previte-Orton, C. W. (Editor), The Shorter Cambridge Medieval History, Volume I: The Later Roman Empire to the Twelfth Century, Cambridge University Press, Cambridge, 1952

Nelson, Janet L., Charles the Bald, Longman Press, 1992

Nelson, Janet L. (Translator), The Annals of St-Bertin, Manchester University Press, Manchester, 1991
