= Robert II of Hesbaye =

Frankish nobleman and count of Worms, Rheingau, and Hesbaye

Robert II (Rodbert, Chrodobert) (died 12 July 807) was a Frankish nobleman who was count of Worms and of Rheingau and count of Hesbaye around the year 800.

It has been proposed that he is the father of Robert III of Worms, and the earliest-known male-line ancestor of the French royal family, the so-called Capetians (including the Valois and the Bourbons), and of other royal families which ruled in Portugal, Spain, Luxembourg, Parma, Brazil and the Two Sicilies.

== Possible ancestry ==
Robert was probably the son of Thuringbert of Worms and Rheingau, and thus a grandson of Robert I, Duke of Neustria (c. 697–748). An alternate theory has him as the son of Robert, son of Thuringbert.

It is also possible that Ingerman of Hesbaye and Cancor were the brothers of Robert of Hesbaye, and Landrada, mother of Saint Chrodegang, archbishop of Metz, is likely to have been his sister. Ermengarde, the wife of emperor Louis the Pious, was probably his niece.

== Sources ==
- Settipani, Christian, Les Ancêtres de Charlemagne, 2e édition revue et corrigée, éd. P & G, Prosopographia et Genealogica, 2015
- Settipani, Christian. Addenda aux "Ancêtres de Charlemagne, 1990
- Riché, Pierre, The Carolingians: a family who forged Europe
