= Rotrude of Hesbaye =

Alternately, Rotrude of Treves; 8th c Frankish Noblewoman and grandmother of Charlemagne

- Died: 724
- Spouse: Charles Martel
- Issue: Carloman; Pepin; Hiltrud; Landrade; Auda

Rotrude (Chrodtrudis) (or Crotude, Chrotrude, or Ruadtrud; died 724) was the first wife of Charles Martel, Mayor of the Palace and de facto ruler of Francia from 718 to 741. She was the mother of Pepin the Short, King of the Franks, and therefore the grandmother of Charlemagne. Rotrude is believed to be the daughter of Lambert, Count of Hesbaye, although this designation is not without controversy, as discussed below. She is also referred to as Rotrude of Treves.

Traditionally, the information available about the family background of Rotrude was the indication that Wido (Guy), Count of Hornbach and Lay Abbot of Fontenelle, was a propinquus of Martel. This kinship term, vague enough, means a close relationship with women: a brother, a cousin by women or a cousin by marriage. Wido is the brother of Milo, Bishop of Trier, and son of Saint Leudwinus, Bishop of Trier.

Christian Settipani, in his work on the ancestors of Charlemagne, details an analysis by Anton Halbedel, first issued in 1915, and echoed by historians Joseph Depoin, Maurice Chaume and Szabolcs de Vajay. According to this analysis, the word propinquus implies "close", so that Wido was Rotrude’s brother. Rotrude has therefore often been identified as the daughter of Saint Leudwinus.

However, in Settipani’s Addendum to the Ancestors of Charlemagne, he returns to this problem, reflecting thoughts of the medieval history professor Richard Gerberding, who believed that Rotrude’s background was related directly to the Robertians. He noted that Charles Martel had three wives and that Wido may be a relative of the other two.

Settipani concludes that Rotrude was the daughter of Lambert, Count of Hesbaye, and so sister of Robert I, Duke of Neustria. In addition, Rotrude’s sister was named Landrada and was married to Sigramnus, Count of Hesbaye. Landrada and Sigramnus were parents of Saint Chrodegang, Bishop of Metz. Note that Rotrude and Charles had a daughter also named Landrade, who is often erroneously identified as the wife of Sigramnus., You would notice on the said pedigree there are ---- this means not conclusive and speculative.

Rotrude and Charles had five children:

- Carloman, Mayor of the Palace
- Pepin the Short, King of the Franks and father of Charlemagne
- Hiltrude, Duchess Consort of Bavaria, married to Odilo, Duke of Bavaria
- (perhaps) Landrade
- (perhaps) Auda of France, married to Thierry IV, Count of Autun.

== Bibliography ==
- Settipani, Christian, Les Ancêtres de Charlemagne, Paris, 2015.
- Settipani, Christian and van Kerrebrouck, Patrick, La préhistoire des Capétiens: 481-987, P. Van Kerrebrouck, 1993.
- Gerberding, Richard A., The Rise of the Carolingians and the Liber Historiae Francorum, Oxford University Press, 1987
- Claussen, Martin A., The Reform of the Frankish Church: Chrodegang of Metz and the Regula Canonicorum in the Eighth Century, Cambridge University Press, 2004
- Rotrude (femme de Charles Martel). French Wikipedia. Includes family tree.
