= Miguel I of Portugal =

King of Portugal from 1828 to 1834

Miguel I
- Duke of Braganza (more)
- Regnal portrait

King of Portugal
- Reign: 11 July 1828 – 26 May 1834
- Acclamation: 11 July 1828
- Predecessor: Maria II
- Successor: Maria II
- Born: 26 October 1802; Lisbon, Portugal
- Died: 14 November 1866 (aged 64); Esselbach, Bavaria
- Burial: 5 April 1967; Pantheon of the Braganzas, Lisbon, Portugal
- Spouse: Adelaide of Löwenstein (m. 1851)
- Issue see details...: Infanta Maria das Neves, Duchess of San Jaime; Miguel Januário, Duke of Braganza; Maria Teresa, Archduchess of Austria; Maria José, Duchess in Bavaria; Infanta Adelgundes, Duchess of Guimarães; Maria Ana, Grand Duchess of Luxembourg; Maria Antónia, Duchess of Parma
Names
- Miguel Maria do Patrocínio João Carlos Francisco de Assis Xavier de Paula Pedro de Alcântara António Rafael Gabriel Joaquim José Gonzaga Evaristo de Bourbon e Bragança
- House: Braganza
- Father: John VI of Portugal
- Mother: Carlota Joaquina of Spain

Dom Miguel I (Anglicized: Michael I, 26 October 1802 – 14 November 1866), known by several nicknames, but mainly “the usurper“, was King of Portugal from 1828 to 1834. He was the son of King John VI and Queen Carlota Joaquina.

Following his exile as a result of his actions in support of absolutism in the April Revolt (Abrilada) of 1824, Miguel returned to Portugal in 1828 as regent and fiancé of his niece who was Queen Maria II. As regent, he claimed the Portuguese throne in his own right, since according to the so-called Fundamental Laws of the Kingdom his older brother Pedro IV and therefore the latter's daughter had lost their rights from the moment that Pedro had made war on Portugal and become the sovereign of a foreign state (Brazilian Empire). This led to a difficult political situation, during which many people were killed, imprisoned, persecuted or sent into exile, and which culminated in the Portuguese Liberal Wars between authoritarian absolutists and progressive constitutionalists. In the end, Miguel was forced out from the throne and lived the last 32 years of his life in exile.

== Early life ==
Miguel Maria do Patrocinio de Bragança e Bourbon, the third (second surviving) son of King John VI and Carlota Joaquina, was born in the Queluz Royal Palace, Lisbon, and was raised by his father Duke of Beja. Some sources have suggested that Miguel I could be the biological son from an adulterous affair between his mother, Queen Carlota, and one of her alleged lovers, possibly D. Pedro José Joaquim Vito de Meneses Coutinho, Marquis of Marialva. Apparently sources close to King John VI confirmed as much by asserting that he had not had sexual relations with his wife for two and a half years prior to Miguel's birth (a period when his parents carried out a conjugal war, during which they were involved in permanent conspiracies, and only encountered each other in rare official circumstances).

But despite the gossip, Miguel was always considered to be a son of the king, by the king, by his mother, by the rest of the family, by the court, and by the church. The "illegitimate child" theories may have had their origins in the writings of pro-liberal propagandists or royalists who wanted to denigrate the queen and undermine the claims of Miguel and of his descendants to the Portuguese throne.

What is clear is that Miguel was the queen's favourite child. After the death of her firstborn, it was Miguel who received most of her attention, rather than Pedro, who was closer to his father.

In 1807, at the age of 5, Miguel accompanied the Portuguese Royal Family on their transfer to Brazil in order to escape from the first Napoleonic invasion of Portugal; he returned in 1821 with John VI and his mother, while his brother Peter remained behind as regent of Brazil.

Miguel was a mischievous child, sometimes seen in the miniature uniform of a general. At sixteen he was seen galloping around Mata-Cavalos, knocking off the hats of passers-by with his riding crop. He spent most of his time with a rowdy band of half-caste or Indian farm-hands. In general, Miguel was spoiled by the queen and her royal household, and clearly influenced by the base tendencies of others. The Duke of Palmela described him as:

"A good man when among good men, and when among the bad, worse than they."

== Revolt ==
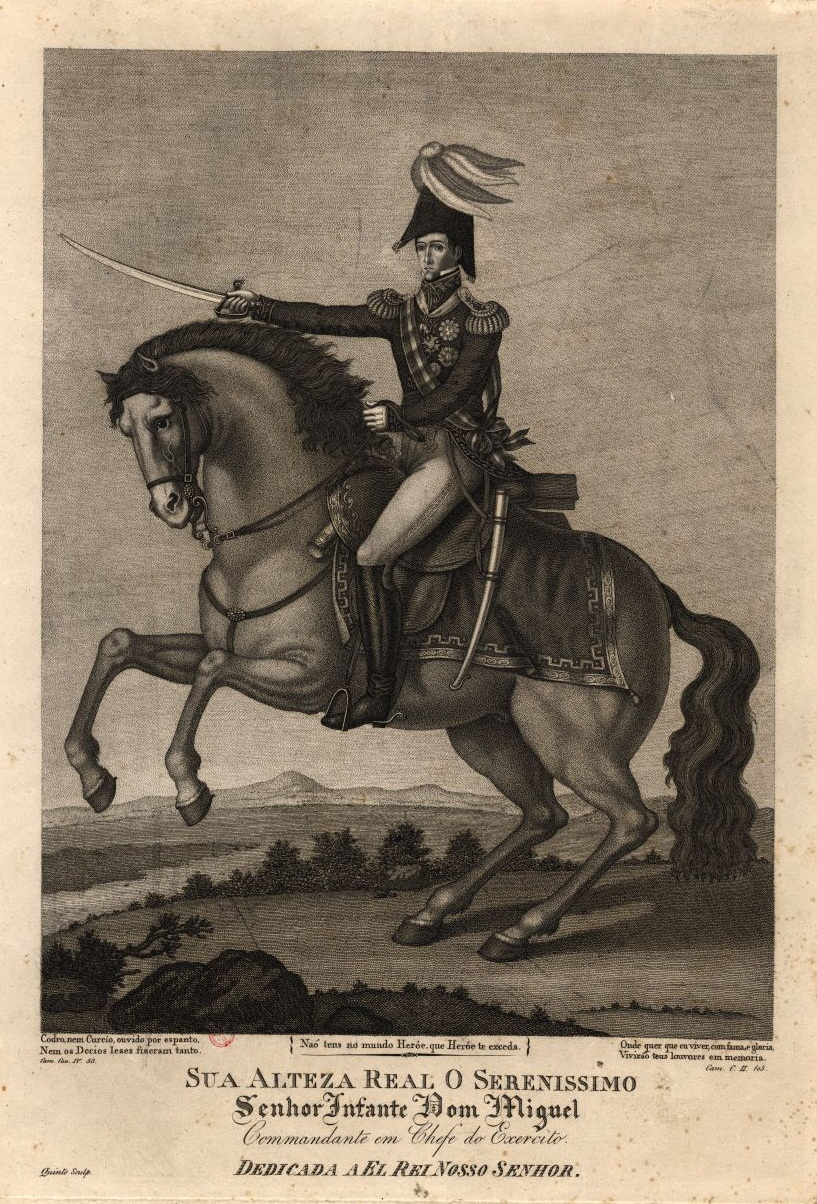
Miguel I around age 21, c. 1823

Miguel was an avowed conservative and admirer of Prince Metternich, who had referred to the liberal revolutions in the 1820s as unrealistic and without any historical roots:

A people who can neither read nor write, whose last word is the dagger – fine material for constitutional principles!...The English constitution is the work of centuries....There is no universal recipe for constitutions.

Miguel was 20 years old when he first challenged the liberal institutions established after the 1820 revolution, which may have been part of a wider strategy by the queen. He was at the head of the counter-revolution of 1823, known as the Vilafrancada, which erupted on 27 May 1823 in Vila Franca de Xira. Early in the day, Miguel joined the 23rd Infantry Regiment, commanded by Brigadier Ferreira Sampaio (later Viscount of Santa Mónica) in Vila Franca, where he declared his support for an absolutist monarchy. He immediately called on General Pampluna (later Marquis of Subserra) to join him and his cause. The general, not a fan of the liberal constitution, obeyed his summons and within five days he controlled the insurrectionary forces. The prince, supported by the queen, went so far as to demand the abdication of the king, who, faithful to his earlier oath, wanted to maintain the 1822 Constitution, despite the growing support for absolutist forces in Vila Franca.

Miguel and the queen were interested in overthrowing the parliamentary system and, inspired by the return of the absolutist monarchy in Spain (where the Holy Alliance and French Army had intervened to destroy the liberal forces there) they exploited factionalism and plotted with outside reactionaries to overthrow the liberal Cortes. But General Pampluna was loyal to the king, and made it perfectly clear that he would do nothing to defy the monarch, and advised the prince to obey his father's summons. The king himself marched on Vila Franca where he received the submission of the troops and his son. But he also took advantage of the situation to abolish the 1822 Constitution and dismiss the Cortes. Many liberals went into exile. Although Miguel returned to Lisbon in triumph, the king was able to maintain complete control of power and did not succumb to the ultra-reactionary forces that supported his abdication.

After the events of the Vilafrancada, Miguel was made Count of Samora Correia and appointed Commander-in-Chief of the Army. But the queen could not tolerate the king's continuing benevolence towards liberals and moderates, nor that he continued to be influenced by and to support ministers such as Palmela and Pamplona, who were more moderate in their outlook.

The mysterious death of the Marquis de Loulé in Salvaterra on 28 February 1824, in which it was suspected that Miguel or his friends were involved, was a symptom of the instability of the period. Prince Miguel was always influenced by his mother; and two months later, on 30 April 1824, as Commander-in-Chief of the Army he gathered his troops and ordered them to arrest ministers and other important people under pretext that a masonic conspiracy to assassinate the king existed, and placed his father in protective custody and incommunicado at Bemposta, where Miguel could "defend and secure his life". The Abrilada, as this was to be known, worried many of the foreign powers. The foreign diplomatic corp (and in particular Marshal Beresford), realising that the king was a prisoner of his son, travelled to Bemposta and was able to ferry the king away and on board a British warship, the Windsor Castle. On board, the king summoned his son, whom he dismissed as Commander-in-Chief of the Army, and immediately exiling him to Vienna, where he remained for over three years.

== Exile and return ==
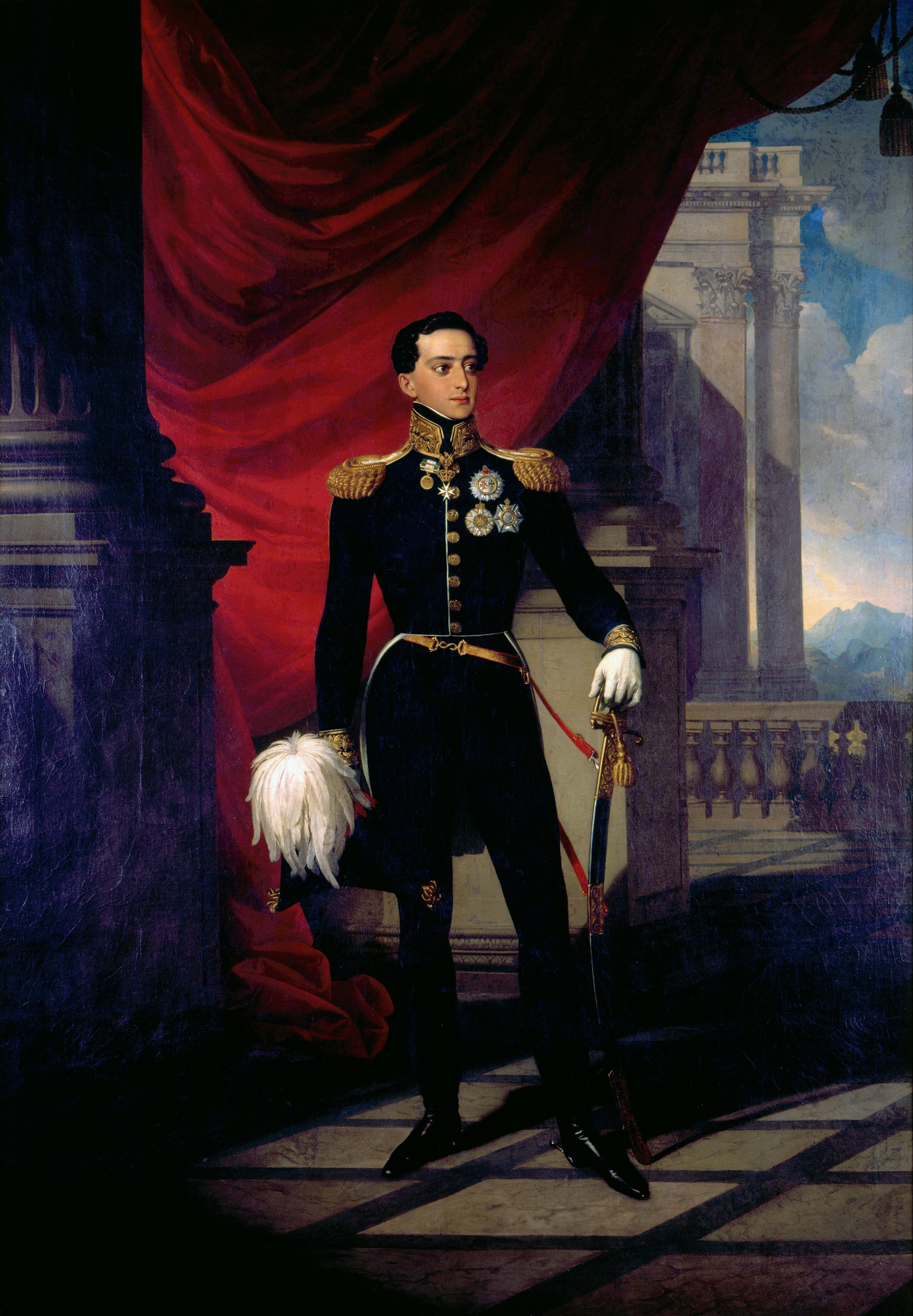
Miguel, after arriving from exile, 1827.

While in Vienna, he was a guest and friend of the Prince Metternich. Meanwhile, on 10 March 1826, his father, King John VI, died and his brother Peter, the heir-apparent to the throne, became king as Peter IV. Peter, however, was committed to continuing as Emperor of Brazil and therefore abdicated the crown of Portugal after two months (on 2 May) in favour of his daughter, Maria II. Since the young sovereign was not yet of age, he instituted a regency, under his sister, Isabel Maria. Peter had already attempted to coerce Miguel to Brazil (1822) away from their mother without any success. Following the death of their father, Peter once again attempted to mend fences within the family and ensure Maria II's right to the throne by offering Miguel the regency of Portugal (when he became 25) under a new liberal Constitutional Charter that would re-establish a constitutional monarchy. Under this arrangement, Queen Maria II and Miguel would be married when she came of age; until then Miguel would be her regent in Portugal. The new Constitutional Charter gave the crown moderating authority between the legislative, executive and judiciary, and introduced a 100-member Chamber of Peers (which included aristocrats and bishops and archbishops), a royal veto and indirect elections. Miguel accepted the proposal from his brother, swore to uphold the Constitutional Charter and, since the young Queen was only nine years old, waited until she would reach the age of marriage.

The regency under Isabel Maria was extremely unstable; discord reigned in the government, (Note: Most of the agitation and discord was fermented by Miguelist parties attempting to justify a return to absolutism, claiming that Peter IV was not the legitimate heir to his father and consequently the Constitutional Charter was invalid; that the defenders of the Charter were traitors; that royalists were republican; and that the liberals were all free-masons (Rocha 1829, pp. 22–24).) there were divisions within the municipal councils, rivalries between ministers and at one point, after the resignation of General Saldanha, a revolt in Lisbon. With Isabel Maria dangerously ill, Peter resolved to entrust his brother Miguel with the kingdom, which Miguel was only too eager to accept. A decree was promulgated on 3 July 1827 that granted Miguel his new role, and he departed from Vienna for Lisbon.

On the trip back to Lisbon he stopped in England, arriving on 30 December 1827. He was met by the Duke of Clarence, heir-presumptive to the British throne, and by other upper members of the English Court who had gathered at the dock to meet him. Arthur Wellesley, 1st Duke of Wellington, then leading an unpopular Tory government, hoped that they could mold Miguel into accepting the constitutional framework that Peter IV had devised, and used this visit to facilitate the transition. After lunching at the Hospital Governor's home, he travelled to London with his entourage in regal carriages and, escorted by cavalry officers, to the Palace of Westminster where he was met by a throng of people. While in London he stayed at the palace of Lord Dudley, on Arlington Street where he entertained his new friends; he was received by the ministers, ambassadors and municipal officials of King George IV, and was generally feted by English nobility, attending concerts and pheasant hunts, and visiting public works (such as the Thames Tunnel on 8 January 1828 which was then under construction and, ironically, collapsed a few days after his visit). On New Year's Eve he visited the King at Windsor Castle and was honoured with a magnificent banquet. Later at Rutland House, Miguel received members of the Portuguese diaspora living in England, who presented him with a commemorative medallion. Throughout his visit he was generally well received.

== Regent ==
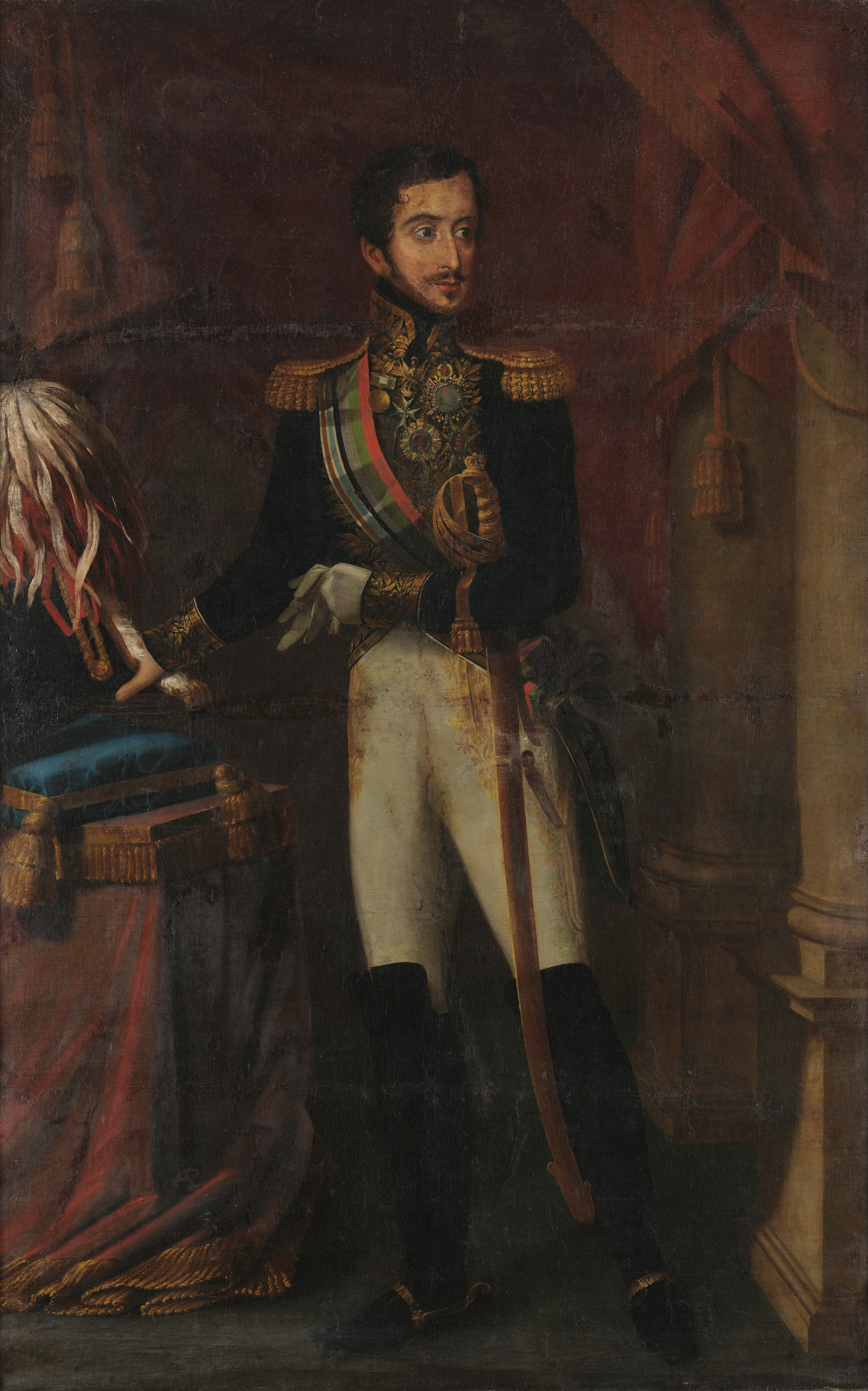
Miguel I around age 26, 1828

On 13 January 1828 Miguel departed London; after spending some time at Stratfield Saye House, the country home of the Duke of Wellington, he travelled to Plymouth en route to Lisbon. Due to bad weather, he was only able to transfer to the Portuguese frigate Pérola on 9 February, which arrived in England accompanied by two British ships. (Note: Cheke credits national pride as the reason for Miguel not embarking on a British ship which would have alleviated his delay in arriving in Lisbon. The young prince, as much as he appreciated his English guests' assistance, saw them as meddling in Portuguese affairs (Cheke 1969, p. 177).) On 22 January the Gazeta de Lisboa (English: Lisbon Gazette) published an open letter from the Ministério da Justiça (English: Ministry of Justice) which permitted any general demonstrations of jubilation (unless otherwise prohibited by law). The prince's ship arrived in Lisbon on 22 February and was met by cannon salvos from ships along the Tagus River and from the hilltops, beginning at two in the afternoon. The river was filled with ships when the Pérola arrived.

Although it was expected that the new regent would disembark at the Praça do Comércio, where a stage had been constructed, Miguel preferred to disembark in Belém. It is believed that Miguel's mother had sent a boatman to pick up the prince and with a message to see her upon arriving in Lisbon, in order to tell her where his loyalties lay. On shore the local population acclaimed their regent with cheers, while bells rang from some church towers and cheerful hymns were sung in the streets. There was a triumphal march to the Ajuda Palace, along streets adorned with silk banners, while the ladies of the city threw flowers. Everywhere there was a multitude of citizenry yelling "Viva o Senhor D. Miguel I nosso rei absoluto" (English: Long live the Lord D. Miguel, our Absolute King), while some interjecting cries of "death to D. Pedro" and "death to the liberal constitution". (Note: Rocha noted that on arrival to Lisbon, these "cheering" fans of the Prince were actually paid six-pence each to yell their interjections, and to attack and insult supporters of the monarch. Prince Schwarzenburg was one of these people who were attacked by so-called gangs of "desperadoes, ragged and bare-footed" paid-off by João dos Santos (Rocha 1829, pp. 26–27).)

But Miguel's role was clearly delineated by his first night in Lisbon: he would govern as regent in the name of the rightful sovereign of Portugal, Queen Maria II. On her reaching marriageable age, Miguel would be her consort. Furthermore, Miguel was obliged to govern in conformity with Peter's Constitutional Charter, something he accepted as a condition of the regency (even if he did not agree with its principles and favoured an absolute monarchy instead).

On 26 February, in the main hall of the Ajuda Palace in the presence of both Chambers of the Cortes, the Royal Court and the diplomatic corp, as well as some of the Prince's colleagues from Brazil (carefully orchestrated by the Queen Dowager), the investiture began. At one o'clock Miguel, along with his sister, Isabel Maria, entered the chamber to formally hand over the Regency. After the spectacle of both of them in the same chair, the princess delivered the transitional oath and then left gracefully. Miguel was presented with the written oath to defend the Constitutional Charter along with a Bible, which caused him "confusion and [he] seemed unable or unwilling to read it." It is also unclear whether he actually swore the oath, since there was no distinct enunciation of the words; nor did any one actually see him kiss the missal (since the Duke of Cadaval obscured the prince during this part of the ceremony). Lord Carnarvon, in Lisbon at the time of the ceremony, wrote of the conclusion of the scene:

During the whole proceeding...his countenance was overcast, and he had the constrained manner of a most unwilling actor in an embarrassing part. I read the approaching fate of the Constitution in his sullen expression, in the imperfect manner in which the oath was administered, and in the strange and general appearance of hurry and concealment.

On 1 March some citizens of Lisbon gathered at the palace to acclaim Miguel "Absolute King", infuriating many of the liberal politicians and residents. Invested in his new title of regent, he presented his Ministers of State in the evening: Nuno III Álvares Pereira de Melo (Duke of Cadaval), José António de Oliveira Leite de Barros (later Count of Basto), Furtado do Rio de Mendonça (7th Viscount of Barbacena & 2nd Count of Barbacena), José Luis de Sousa Botelho Mourão e Vasconcelos (Count of Vila Real) and the Count of Lousã. Within a week numerous moderate army officers had been dismissed and the military governors of the provinces replaced, as the Prince and Queen Dowager "cleaned house" of their old enemies and liberalist sympathisers.

== King of Portugal ==
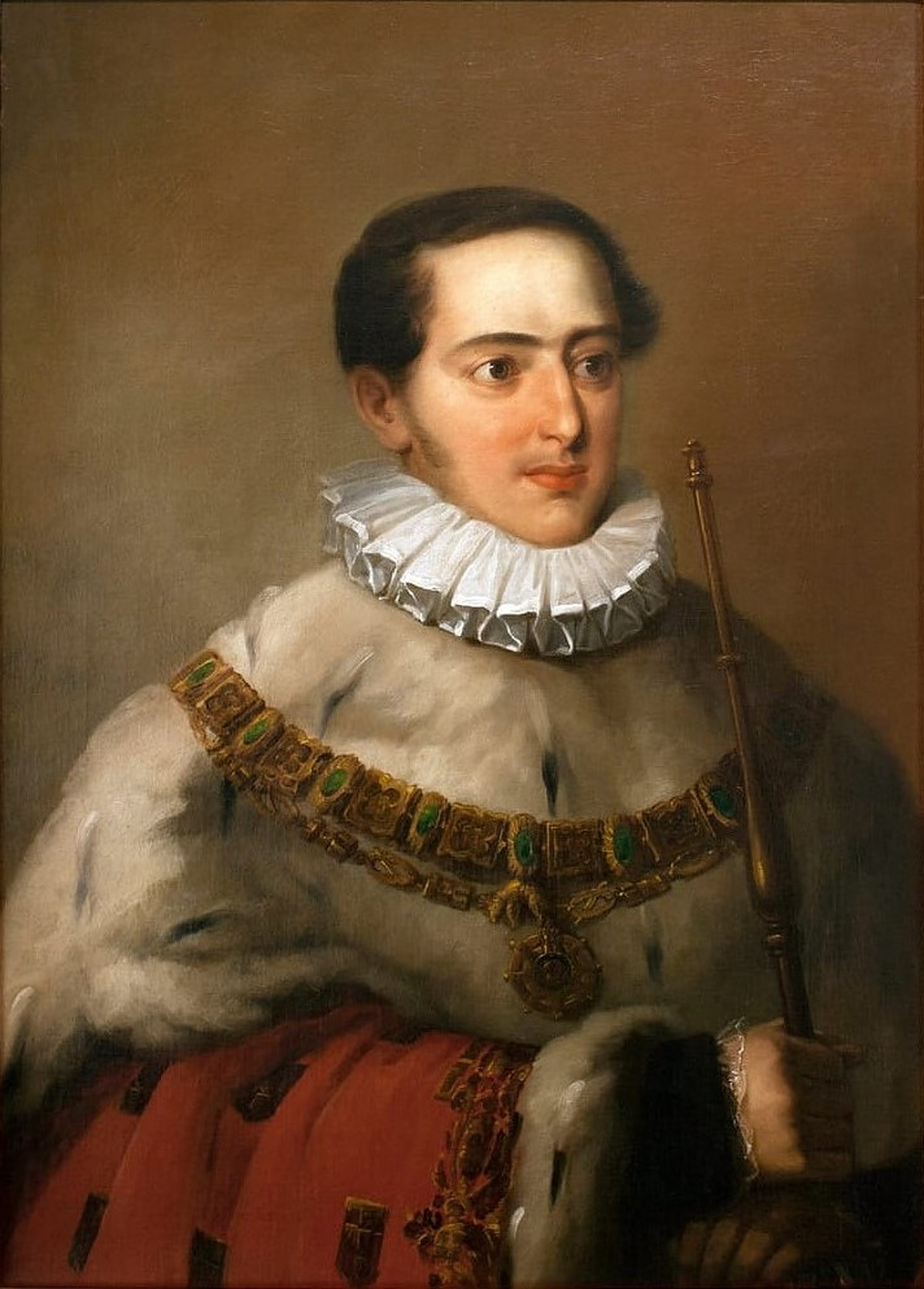
Miguel I around age 26, c. 1828

On 13 March 1828 Miguel dissolved the Cortes without calling new elections, as stipulated in the Constitutional Charter. Some municipal councils, many nobles and clergy, (Note: In the eyes of the clergy, the people who were against the absolutist monarchy were the Freemasons, heretics, Jews, and foreigners (Macaulay 1986, p. 263).) and several important citizens requested that the regent revoke the Constitutional Charter and reign as king. Blood was first spilled by the liberals, when delegates from the University of Coimbra (who ostensibly travelled to Lisbon to present their compliments to Miguel) were murdered on 18 March by hot-headed Coimbran students. On 25 April the senate (of the university), issued a proclamation in which they requested that Miguel assume the throne. This only fueled the divisions between liberals and absolutists. Because of the independence of Brazil, Miguel's supporters considered Miguel to be the legitimate heir to the crown of Portugal. If, to liberals, the name of Miguel was despised, to the legitimists (the absolutists) it was venerated. But Miguel's reign was immediately marked by cruel, almost tyrannical, governance which some attribute to him personally; however some blame the injustices on his subordinates, while others attribute them to the malevolence of Queen Charlotte.

On 3 May 1828, the very nobles who had been nominated by Peter to the new Chamber of Peers met in the Palace of the Duke of Lafões, and invited Miguel to convoke new Cortes consisting of the Three Estates with the purpose to decide the legitimate succession to the throne. The Cortes met in June at Ajuda, where the Bishop of Viseu proposed that Miguel should assume the crown since "...the hand of the Almighty led Your Majesty from the banks of the Danube to the shore of the Tagus to save his people...". On 7 July Miguel was acclaimed as absolute ruler, and on 11 July the Three Estate Cortes closed.

Shortly afterwards the military garrison in Porto revolted, formed a provisional governmental junta, and marched on Coimbra to defend the liberal cause. But the general in command of these troops was indecisive, and Miguel was able to raise his own troops, create a battalion of volunteers and blockade Porto. In Lagos a similar revolt was attempted, but immediately quashed when the liberal General Saraiva was shot by the Miguelist General Póvoas. On this occasion, João Carlos Saldanha (later Duke of Saldanha) and Pedro de Sousa Holstein (later 1st Duke of Palmela), who had arrived from England on board the British ship Belfast in order to lead constitutional forces, quickly re-embarked, judging the liberal cause lost. The liberal army escaped to deplorable conditions in Galicia where they awaited the next move. In the former regency's court there were few strong supporters of a constitutional monarchy; Princess Isabella Maria was supported by weak-willed ministers or incompetents and was personally too timid to stand up to Miguel. The liberals and their supporters escaped into exile. All of Portugal recognised the sovereignty of the monarch, except the islands of Madeira and Terceira; Madeira was easily subjugated, but Terceira remained faithful to the liberal cause.

The excess zeal of his supporters to prosecute the liberals would damage the reputation of Miguel's regime. During the liberal insurrection on 6 March 1829 in Cais do Sodré, Brigadier Moreira, his officers and their supporters were all bayoneted. On 7 May the members of the rebel garrison of Porto who had revolted were also executed. In some cases, the local population contributed to these horrors and reprisals, as in Vila Franca da Xira where they assassinated 70 people believed to have liberal sympathies. Although these actions were disapproved of by many of Miguel's ministers, the Count of Basto was not one of them. Even the Viscount of Queluz, a medic and intimate friend of the Miguel, was exiled to Alfeite for joining the chorus of those who challenged the reprisal killings. But the Queen Mother continued to support the attacks on liberals, and motivated these actions in order to strengthen the monarchy. Even after she died on 7 January 1830, many atrocities continued to be committed in the name of Miguel, some against foreign nationals who intervened in the politics of Portugal.

While Spain, the Holy See, and the United States recognised Miguel as king, in England and France there was little public support for the regime. (Note: Miguel sought to gain international backing for his regime, but the government of Arthur Wellesley, 1st Duke of Wellington in the United Kingdom fell in 1830, just before it could afford a formal recognition. In its place a Liberal government was elected, whose foreign policy was dominated by Lord Palmerston (Birmingham 2003, p. 117).) The imprudence that the Miguelist government showed in harassing English and French foreign nationals provoked them to protest. Eventually Admiral Albin Roussin, was ordered by Louis Philippe I (who, like England, could not obtain any diplomatic satisfaction), to take action; he sailed up the Tagus, captured eight Portuguese ships and forcibly imposed a treaty (14 July 1831). But, Miguelist reprisals on liberals continued; most sentences were carried out within 24 hours. The 4th Infantry, in Lisbon, registered 29 executions on 22 and 23 August 1831 alone.

== Liberal Wars ==
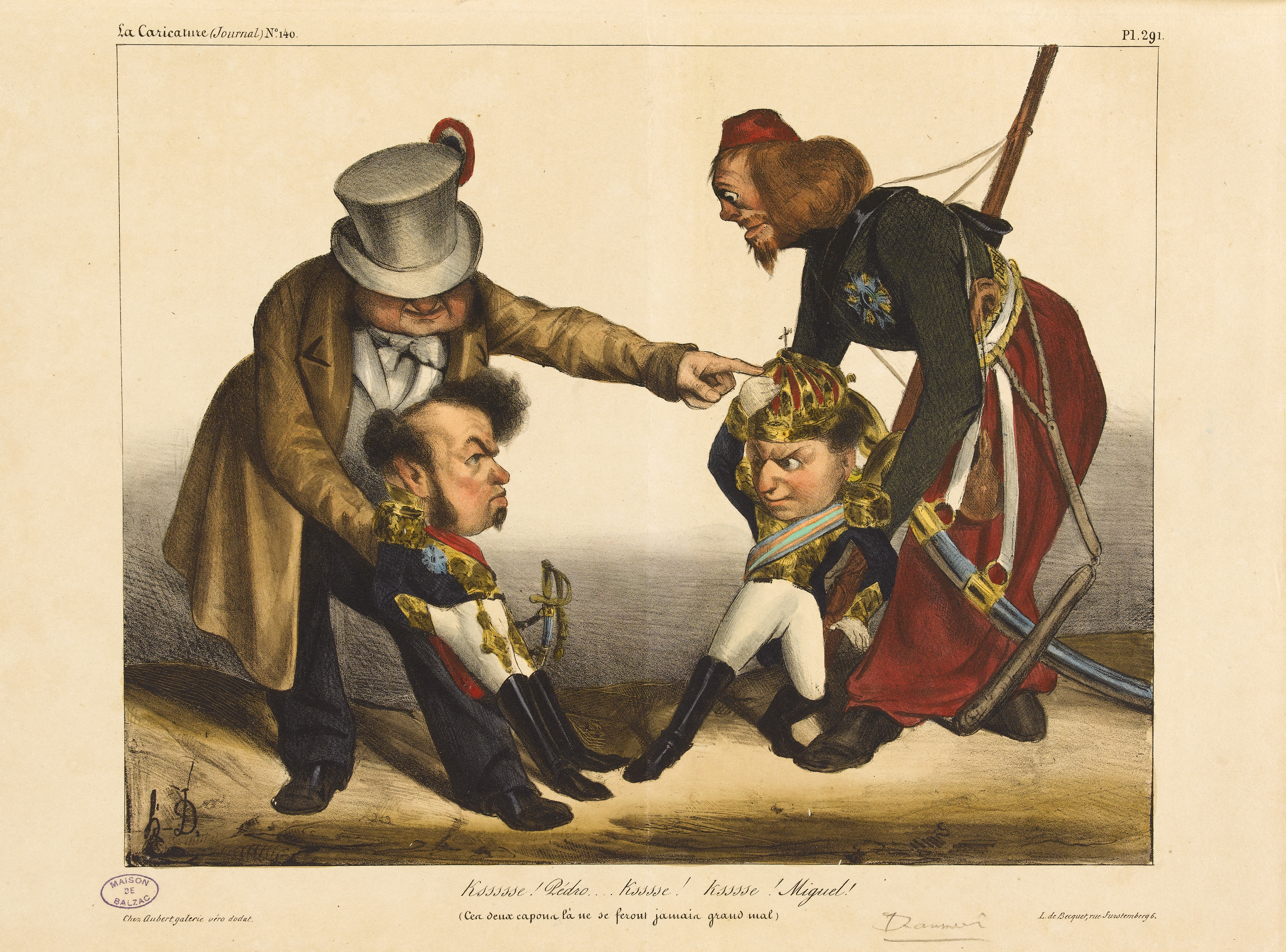
A period cartoon, showing the conflict between the Two Brothers, as children, supported and instigated, respectively, by the French King Louis Philippe I, representing the liberal side, and Czar Nicholas I of Russia, representing the anti-liberalist Holy Alliance

Only the island of Terceira in the Azores remained loyal to Queen Maria II; the constitutional government continued to function there in exile. At first João Carlos Saldanha was unable to reach the island, owing to the hostility of an English cruiser, but the Count of Vila Flor (later Duke of Terceira) was more successful; he arrived on the island, rebuilt the defences and quickly beat back Miguel's forces (on 11 August 1829) as they were attempting to invade the island. By 1831 the liberals had taken over all the islands of the Azores.

Peter, after abdicating the imperial crown of Brazil, placed himself at the head of the Liberal Army (1831) and from the Azores launched an invasion of northern Portugal, Landing at Mindelo, near Porto which he quickly occupied. But Miguel's army was formidable, composed of the best troops, with dedicated volunteers and enthusiastic militiamen (although not, perhaps, the best senior officers). They easily encircled the city and lay siege to it. As the defence of Porto persisted, Miguel resolved to visit his troops in April 1833. But in the meantime Lisbon fell into the hands of the Duke of Terceira, who had left Porto earlier in the Liberal fleet commanded by Charles John Napier, disembarked in the Algarve and marched across the Alentejo to defeat the Miguelist General Teles Jordão (seizing the city on 24 July). Napier, after defeating a Miguelist fleet off Cape St. Vincent, joined the Duke of Terceira in the north, taking control of the Tagus.

Miguel was assisted by the French General Bourmont, who, after the fall of Charles X of France came with many of his legitimist officers to the aid of the king of Portugal (that is, Miguel). He was later replaced by the Scottish General Ranald MacDonnell who withdrew the Miguelist army besieging Lisbond to the almost impregnable heights of Santarém, where Miguel established his base of operations. The battles continued in earnest. In Alcácer the Miguelist forces captured some ground but this was quickly lost to General Saldanha in Pernes and Almoster. The latter action (18 February 1834) was the most violent and bloody of the civil war. In the end, politics sealed Miguel's fate: his alliance with Carlos of Spain alienated the sympathies of Ferdinand VII of Spain, who recognised Maria's claim to the Portuguese throne, and concluded a quadruple alliance with the queen and Peter as well as with the governments of France and England.

The Spanish General Rodil entered into Portugal while pursuing D. Carlos and his small force and at the same time the Duke of Terceira won the Battle of Asseiceira (16 May 1834) making D. Miguel's position critical. Miguel escaped Santarém and moved south-east in the direction of Elvas. While Miguel made for Évora, his generals voted in a council of war to suspend hostilities and sue for peace. Miguel accepted the decision.

After a three-year civil war, Miguel I was forced to abdicate at the Concession of Evoramonte (26 May 1834). While Carlos was transported to England (he later secretly returned to Spain), Miguel embarked on 1 June 1834 on a British warship from Sines bound for Genoa; he lived in exile first in Italy, then in England, and finally in Germany. He never returned to Portugal.

== Second exile and death ==
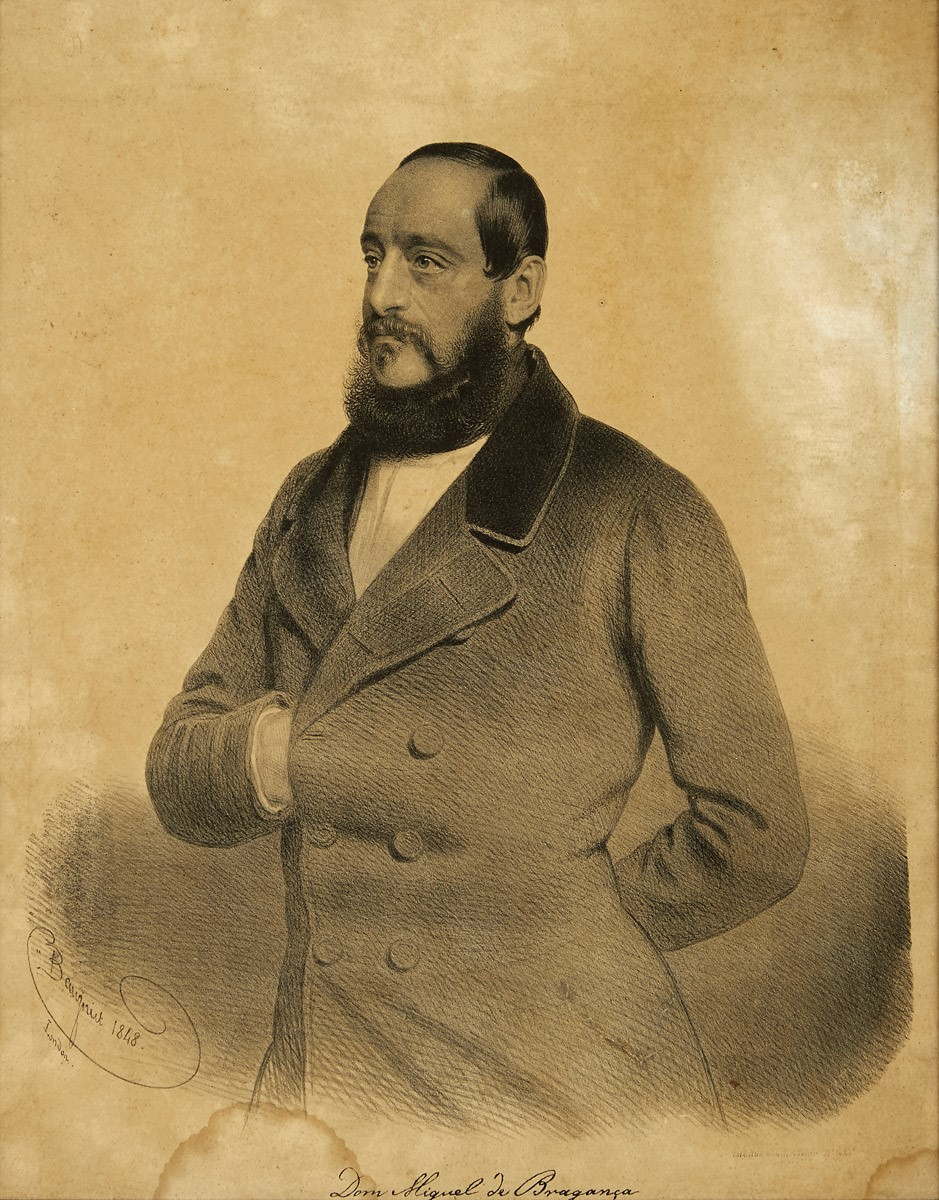
Miguel I in exile

In December 1834 the Portuguese Cortes banished Miguel and all his descendants from Portugal upon pain of immediate death. The Constitution of 1838 (article 98) categorically excluded the collateral Miguelist line from the throne (although with the return to the Constitutional Charter in 1842, this ceased to have force). The 1834 banishment law remained in effect until repealed in May 1950. During his exile, he was known as Duke of Braganza, as well as Marquis of Vila Viçosa, Count of Arraiolos, Count of Barcelos, Count of Neiva and Count of Ourém.

On 15 January 1837 the Spanish Cortes, then in midst of the First Carlist War (1833–39), excluded Miguel from the Spanish succession, on the grounds that he was in rebellion along with his maternal uncle Carlos, the first Carlist pretender of Spain. Miguel's eldest sister Teresa, Princess of Beira, and his nephews (the three sons of late Infanta Maria Francisca of Portugal, and Sebastian, son of Teresa, Princess of Beira) were also excluded.

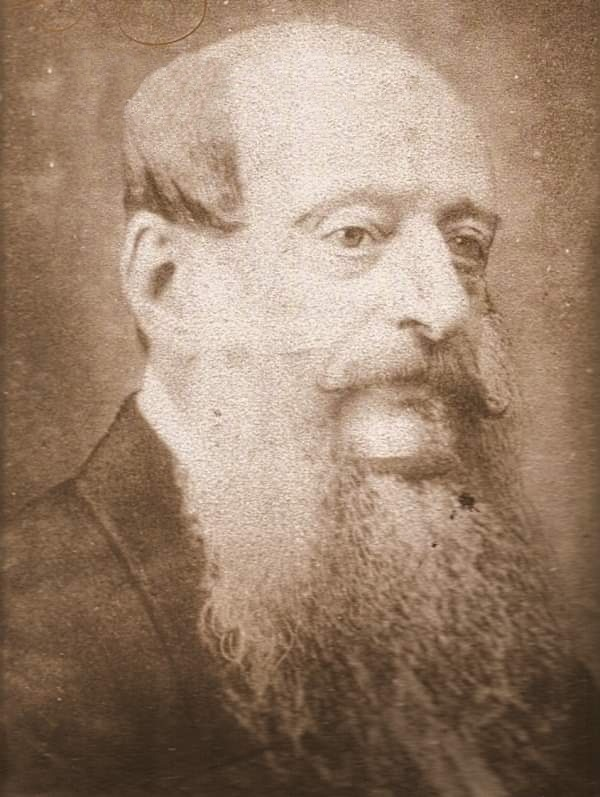
Miguel in old age

Miguel lived the rest of his life in exile and, removed from Portuguese politics, his character altered radically; in his later years he was a portly heavily bearded patriarch and lacked the cowboy persona of his early life. He refused to accede to the terms of the Concession of Evoramonte and thereby forfeited his generous pension from the Portuguese government. He lived for a time as a destitute refugee in Rome, in apartments provided by Pope Gregory XVI, who also gave him a small monthly allowance. Following the death of Pope Gregory and the election of Pius IX as Pope, D. Miguel moved to London, arriving on 2 February 1847. In order to counter the Republican opposition from the Portuguese Freemasons, the dynastic order known as Order of Saint Michael of the Wing was revived in 1848, with statutes issued by King Miguel I of Portugal. In 1851, he moved to the Grand Duchy of Baden in southern Germany and married Princess Adelaide of Löwenstein-Wertheim-Rosenberg. They settled in the former Cistercian monastery of Bronnbach, and raised seven children. His widow succeeded in securing advantageous marriages for all their daughters.

Miguel died while hunting at Bronnbach, Grand Duchy of Baden, on 14 November 1866. He was buried in his wife's family's vault in the Franciscan monastery of Engelberg at Grossheubach, Bavaria. In 1967 his body and that of his wife (then resting in Ryde on the Isle of Wight in England) were transferred to the Braganza pantheon in the old Monastery of São Vicente de Fora in Lisbon.

== Titles and honours ==
Royal styles of King Miguel I of Portugal
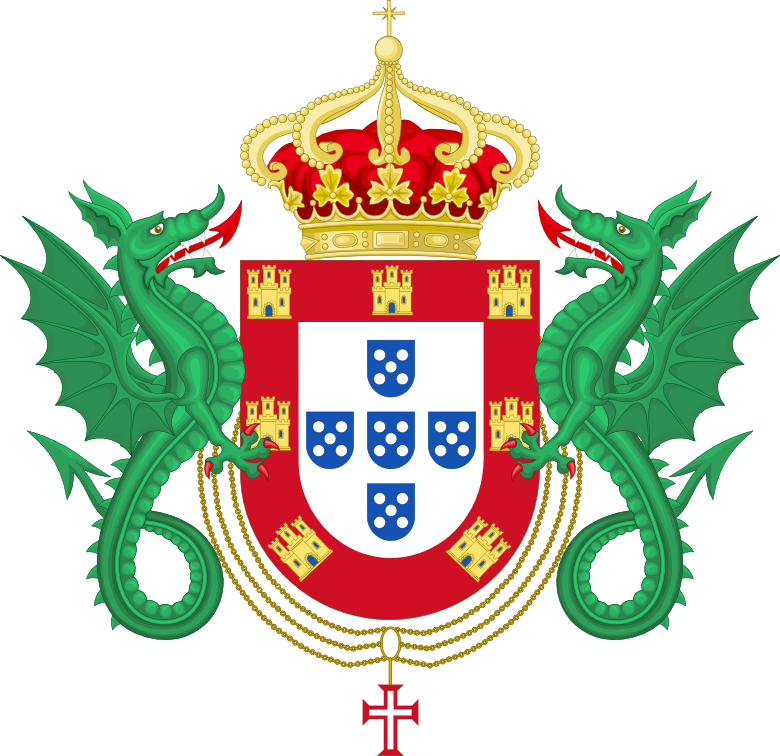
- Reference style: His Most Faithful Majesty
- Spoken style: Your Most Faithful Majesty

In addition to his hereditary titles, over the course of his career Miguel received many awards and honours, including the following.

Portuguese honours

- Grand Commander of the Three Military Orders of Christ, Aviz and St. James
- Grand Cross of the Tower and Sword
- Grand Cross of the Immaculate Conception of Vila Viçosa
- Grand Master of the Order of St. Michael of the Wing (revoked)
- Grand Prior of the Order of St. John of Jerusalem in Portugal

Foreign dynastic orders

- Empire of Brazil: Grand Cross of the Southern Cross
- Spain:
  - Grand Cross of the Order of Charles III, 19 February 1802
  - Knight of the Golden Fleece, 19 February 1804
- United Kingdom: Knight of the Thistle
- Austrian Empire: Grand Cross of St. Stephen, 1826
- Kingdom of France:
  - Knight of the Holy Spirit, 1823
  - Knight of St. Michael, 1823
  - Grand Cross of the Military Order of St. Louis
- Two Sicilies: Grand Cross of St. Ferdinand and Merit
- Russian Empire:
  - Knight of St. Andrew, 16 February 1824
  - Knight of St. Alexander Nevsky, 16 February 1824
  - Knight of St. Anna, 1st Class, 16 February 1824
- Baden: Grand Cross of the House Order of Fidelity, 1827

Posthumously, or during his reign, Miguel was known by various epithets:

- O Tradicionalista ("The Traditionalist")
- O Usurpador ("The Usurper")
- O Absolutista ("The Absolutist")
- O Sacrificado ("The Sacrificed")
- O Rei Absoluto ("The Absolute King")

== Marriage and descendants ==
On 24 September 1851, at the age of 48, he married Princess Adelaide of Löwenstein, by whom he had seven children.

Name	Birth	Death	Notes
Infanta Maria das Neves	5 August 1852	15 February 1941	Married Alfonso Carlos, Duke of San Jaime, Carlist claimant to the throne of Spain
Infante Miguel	19 September 1853	11 October 1927	Duke of Braganza, and grandfather of the current throne claimant, Duarte Pio, Duke of Braganza
Infanta Maria Theresa	24 August 1855	12 February 1944	Became the third wife of Archduke Karl Ludwig of Austria
Infanta Maria Josepha	19 March 1857	11 March 1943	Became the second wife of Karl Theodor, Duke in Bavaria
Infanta Adelgundes	10 November 1858	15 April 1946	Became the second wife of Prince Enrico of Bourbon-Parma, Count of Bardi, son of Charles III, Duke of Parma
Infanta Marie Anne	13 July 1861	31 July 1942	Married Guillaume IV, Grand Duke of Luxembourg
Infanta Maria Antónia	28 November 1862	14 May 1959	Became the second wife of Robert I, Duke of Parma

== Ancestry ==
Ancestors of Miguel I of Portugal

8. John V of Portugal
4. Peter III of Portugal
9. Maria Anna of Austria
2. John VI of Portugal and Brazil
10. Joseph I of Portugal
5. Maria I of Portugal and Brazil
11. Mariana Victoria of Spain
1. Miguel I of Portugal
12. Charles III of Spain
6. Charles IV of Spain
13. Maria Amalia of Saxony
3. Carlota Joaquina of Spain
14. Philip, Duke of Parma
7. Maria Luisa of Parma
15. Louise Élisabeth of France

=== Patrilineal descent ===
Patrilineal descent

Patrilineal descent is the principle behind membership in royal houses, as it can be traced back through the generations.

Miguel's patriline is the line from which he is descended father to son.

1. Robert II, Count of Worms, Rheingau and Hesbaye, 770–807
2. Robert III, Count of Worms and Rheingau, 808–834
3. Robert IV the Strong, Duke of Maine, 820–866
4. Robert I, King of the Franks, 866–923
5. Hugh the Great, Count of Paris, 898–956
6. Hugh Capet, King of the Franks, 941–996
7. Robert II, King of the Franks, 972–1031
8. Robert I, Duke of Burgundy, 1011–1076
9. Henri of Burgundy, 1035–c. 1074
10. Henrique, Count of Portugal, 1066–1112
11. Afonso Henriques, King of Portugal, 1109–1185
12. Sancho I, King of Portugal, 1154–1211
13. Afonso II, King of Portugal, 1185–1223
14. Afonso III, King of Portugal and the Algarve, 1210–1279
15. Dinis, King of Portugal and the Algarve, 1261–1325
16. Afonso IV, King of Portugal and the Algarve, 1291–1357
17. Pedro I, King of Portugal and the Algarve, 1320–1367
18. João I, King of Portugal and the Algarve, 1357–1433
19. Afonso, Duke of Braganza, 1377–1461
20. Fernando I, Duke of Braganza, 1403–1478
21. Fernando II, Duke of Braganza, 1430–1483
22. Jaime, Duke of Braganza, 1479–1532
23. Teodósio I, Duke of Braganza, 1510–1563
24. João I, Duke of Braganza, 1543–1583
25. Teodósio II, Duke of Braganza, 1558–1630
26. João IV, King of Portugal and the Algarves, 1604–1656
27. Pedro II, King of Portugal and the Algarves, 1648–1706
28. João V, King of Portugal and the Algarves, 1689–1750
29. Pedro III, King of Portugal and the Algarves, 1717–1786
30. João VI, King of Portugal, Brazil and the Algarves, 1767–1826
31. Miguel, King of Portugal and the Algarves, 1802–1866

== Notes ==
Miguel I of Portugal House of Braganza Cadet branch of the House of Aviz Born: 26 October 1802 Died: 14 November 1866
Honorary titles
Vacant Title last held by Infante Pedro	Prior of Crato; 1802–1824	Vacant Title next held by Guilherme Henriques de Carvalho
Portuguese royalty
Vacant Title last held by Infante João	Lord of the Infantado; 1802–1824	Extinct
Vacant Title last held by Infante João	Duke of Beja; 1816–1828	Vacant Title next held by Infante João
Style adopted	Duke of Braganza; Miguelist line 1834–1866	Succeeded by Miguel
Political offices
Preceded by Infanta Isabel Maria	Regent of Portugal; 1828	Vacant Title next held by Pedro IV
Regnal titles
Preceded by Maria II	King of Portugal; 1828–1834	Succeeded by Maria II
Titles in pretence
Dethroned	— TITULAR — King of Portugal; Miguelist line 1834–1866	Succeeded by Miguel
