= Lambert of Hesbaye =

Noblilis

Lambert Ι (died after 650), was a Neustrian nobleman who was son of Robert I, Bishop of Tours. Lambert is identified as a noblilis in Neustria, son of Chrodbert I and father of Chrodbert II in Europäische Stammtafeln, and as such, is a direct ancestor of the Robertians. Brother to Angadrisma, he is sometimes confused with their cousin and her mentor Lambert.

The name of Lambert’s wife may have been Chrotlind of unknown parentage. They had the following children:

- Robert II, Lord Chancellor of France
- Theodard, Bishop of Maastricht-Liège

It is possible that Theodard was Robert's brother-in-law rather than his brother. Because of his family, Lambert probably held a position in the royal court, but the precise nature of this is unknown. He is sometimes referred to as Lambert I to distinguish him from his descendant Lambert II, Count of Hesbaye.

== Sources ==
- Settipani, Christian, Les Ancêtres de Charlemagne, 2e édition revue et corrigée, éd. P & G, Prosopographia et Genealogica, 2015,
- Settipani, Christian. Addenda aux Ancêtres de Charlemagne, 1990
- Europäische Stammtafeln (available on-line)
