= Robertians =

Medieval Frankish noble family

Robertian dynasty Robertiens
- Royal house
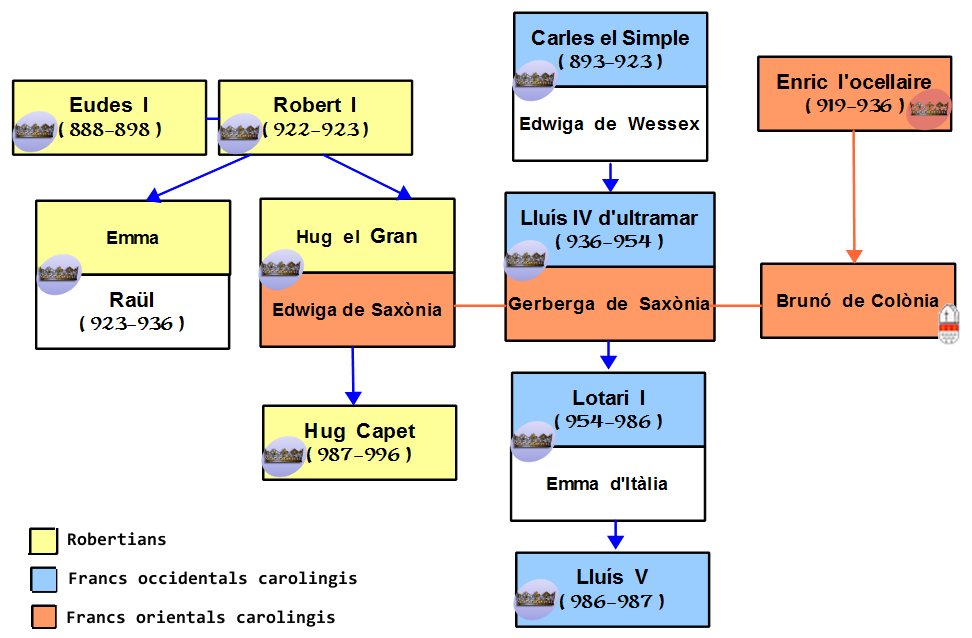
- Country: Francia; West Francia
- Founded: ca. 800
- Founder: Robert of Hesbaye
- Final ruler: Hugh the Great
- Titles: Kings of West Francia; Dukes of the Franks; Dukes of Burgundy; Margraves of Neustria; Counts of Paris; Counts of Hesbaye; County of Orléans; Counts of Worms
- Dissolution: 956
- Cadet branches: Popponids; Capetians

The Robertians (sometimes called the Robertines in modern scholarship) are a proposed Frankish noble family and royal dynasty, whose members were ancestors of the Capetian dynasty that ruled over the Kingdom of France and several other countries (currently Spain and Luxembourg). Prominent Robertian ancestors of the Capetian dynasty appear in historical records as powerful nobles serving under various rulers of the Carolingian dynasty, mainly in West Francia, which later became France. Most notable of them were: the eponymous count Robert the Strong (d. 866) and his sons, West Frankish kings Odo (888–898) and Robert I (922–923), whose son – duke Hugh the Great was father to the first Capetian king Hugh Capet (987–996).

== Origin ==
The ancestry of count Robert the Strong (d. 866) is not certain, and it has been the subject of various genealogical assumptions and historical studies. Robert's origins remain unclear, but medieval records hint at an origin in Austrasia, or East Francia (in present-day Germany), an area then still also ruled by the Carolingians. In particular, Regino of Prüm (died 915) states that Robert the Strong's son Odo was said to be a relative (nepos) of a Count Meingaud, count of an area near Worms, who died in 892, and there are indications that Maingaud's family used the names Robert and Odo.

Modern proposals about their ancestry further back are based on the idea that there was one family which frequently named its sons Robert, including Robert III of Worms (800–834), Robert the Strong (d. 866), and Robert I of France (866–923). For example, one proposed ancestor is Robert of Hesbaye (c. 800), about whom there are almost no records.

The Robertian family figured prominently amongst the Carolingian nobility and married into this royal family. Eventually, the Robertians themselves produced Frankish kings such as the brothers Odo (reigned 888–898) and Robert I (r. 922–923), then Hugh Capet (r. 987–996), who ruled from his seat in Paris as the first Capetian king of France.

Although Philip II Augustus (r. 1180–1223) was officially the last monarch of France with the title "King of the Franks" (rex Francorum) and the first to style himself "King of France" (roi de France), in (systematic application of) historiography, Hugh Capet holds this distinction. He founded the Capetians, the royal dynasty that ruled France until the revolution of the Second French Republic in 1848—save during the interregnum of the French Revolution and Napoleonic Wars. Members of the family still reign in Europe today : both King Felipe VI of Spain and Grand Duke Henri of Luxembourg descend from this family through the Bourbon cadet branch of the dynasty.

The oldest known Robertians probably originated in the county of Hesbaye, around Tongeren in modern-day Belgium. The first certain ancestor is Robert the Strong count of Paris, probably the son of Robert III of Worms, grandson of Robert of Hesbaye, and nephew of Ermengarde of Hesbaye, who was the daughter of Ingram, and wife of Louis the Pious. Other related family includes Cancor, founder of the Lorsch Abbey, his sister Landrada and her son Saint Chrodogang, archbishop of Metz.

== History ==
West Frankish realm of king Odo (888–898), and neighboring kingdoms: Western Frankish Kingdom (king Odo, since 888) Eastern Frankish Kingdom (king Arnulf, since 887) Italy (rival kings Berengar I and Guy, since 888–889) Upper Burgundy (king Rudolph I, since 888) Lower Burgundy and Provence (king Louis, since 890)

The sons of Robert the Strong were Odo and Robert, who were both king of Western Francia and ruled during the Carolingian era. His daughter Richildis married a count of Troyes. The family became Counts of Paris under Odo (882), and "Dukes of the Franks" under Robert, possessing large parts of the ancient Neustria. Although quarrels continued between Robert's son Hugh the Great and Louis IV of France, they were mended upon the ascension of Lothair I of France (954–986). Lothair greatly expanded the Robertian dominions when he granted Hugh Aquitaine as well as much of Burgundy, both rich and influential territories, arguably two of the richest in France.

The Carolingian dynasty ceased to rule France upon the death of Louis V (d. 987). After the death of Louis, the son of Hugh the Great, Hugh Capet was chosen as king of the Franks, nominally the last ruler of West Francia. Given the resurgence of the Holy Roman Empire title and dignities in the West Francian kingdom, Europe was later believed to have entered a new age, so Hugh came to be known in historiography as the first king of France, as western civilization was perceived to have entered the High Middle Ages period. Hugh was crowned at Noyon on July 3, 987 with the full support of Holy Roman Emperor Otto III. With Hugh's coronation, a new era began for France, and his descendants came to be named, after him, the Capetians. They ruled France as the Capetians, Valois, and Bourbons until the French Revolution. They returned after 1815 and ruled until Louis Philippe was deposed in 1848.

However, they have continued to rule Spain, with two republican interruptions, through the Bourbon Dynasty right down to the current king Felipe VI.

== Family branches ==
- Robert I, Count of Hesbaye (697-748), Count of Hesbaye and Duke of Neustria, married Williswinda of Worms
  - Cancor (d. 771), founder of Lorsch Abbey
    - Heimrich (d. 795), count in the Lahngau
      - Poppo of Grapfeld (d. 839–41), ancestor of the Frankish House of Babenberg
  - Landrada, married Sigramnus, Count of Hesbaye
    - Saint Chrodogang (d. 766), Archbishop of Metz, Abbot of Lorsch Abbey
    - Sigram of Hesbaye
      - Ingerman, Count of Hesbaye (750-818)
        - Ermengarde of Hesbaye (778-818), wife of Emperor Louis the Pious
  - Thuringbert, Count of Hesbaye (735-770)
    - Robert II, Count of Hesbaye (770–807)
      - Robert III of Worms (800–834)
        - Robert the Strong (830–866), married once or twice, a wife of his might have been called Emma.
          - Odo of Paris (857-898), king of West Francia from 888, married Théodrate of Troyes
            - Raoul
            - Arnulf
            - Guy
          - Richildis, or Regilindis, married to William I of Périgueux, son of Count Wulgrin I of Angoulême
          - Robert (866–923), king of West Francia from 922, second marriage to Béatrice of Vermandois
            - Emma (894–935), married Rudolph of Burgundy
            - Adela, married Herbert II, Count of Vermandois
            - Hugh the Great (898–956), married for the 3rd time to Hedwige of Saxony, daughter of German king Henry the Fowler
              - Béatrice (c.938–987), married Frederick of Bar
              - Hugh Capet (c.939–996), ancestor of the Capetian dynasty
              - Emma of Paris, Duchess of Normandy (c.943–968), married Richard I, Duke of Normandy
              - Otto of Paris (c.944–965), Duke of Burgundy from 956
              - Odo-Henry (c.946–1002), Duke of Burgundy from 965
              - Herbert (d. 996), Bishop of Auxerre

== Sources ==
- Bouchard, Constance B. (1981). "The Origins of the French Nobility: A Reassessment". The American Historical Review. 86 (3): 501–532.
- Bouchard, Constance B. (1999). "Burgundy and Provence, 879–1032". The New Cambridge Medieval History. Vol. 3. Cambridge: Cambridge University Press. pp. 328–345.
- Bouchard, Constance B. (2001). Those of My Blood: Creating Noble Families in Medieval Francia. Philadelphia: University of Pennsylvania Press.
- Bouchard, Constance B. (2014). Rewriting Saints and Ancestors: Memory and Forgetting in France, 500–1200. Philadelphia: University of Pennsylvania Press.
- Bradbury, Jim (2007). The Capetians: Kings of France, 987-1328. London: Continuum Books.
- Jackman, Donald C. (2008). Comparative Accuracy. State College, PA: Editions Endlaplage.
- MacLean, Simon (2003). Kingship and Politics in the Late Ninth Century: Charles the Fat and the end of the Carolingian Empire. New York: Cambridge University Press.
- Nelson, Janet L. (1991). The Annals of St-Bertin. Manchester: Manchester University Press.
- Nelson, Janet L. (1992). Charles the Bald. London and New York: Longman.
- Nelson, Janet L. (1996). The Frankish World, 750-900. London: The Hambledon Press.
- Riché, Pierre (1993). The Carolingians: A Family Who Forged Europe. Philadelphia: University of Pennsylvania Press.
- Settipani, Christian and Patrick van Kerrebrouck. La Préhistoire des Capétiens, 481-987. Première partie: Mérovingiens, Carolingiens et Robertiens. Villeneuve d'Ascq, 1993.
