= List of Merovingian referendaries =

The referendary (Latin: referendarius; French: référendaire) was the officer of the palace in the Merovingian period who made the report of the royal letters in the chancelleries, so as to decide whether they should be signed and sealed.

They were frequently also the Lord Chancellors serving the Merovingian dynasty.

== Referendaries ==
Known referendaries include:

- Saint Rémigius, Bishop of Reims (497–533)
- Siggo, in the courts of Sigebert I, then Chilperic I and finally Childebert II (561)
- Ansbert, Bishop of Rouen, in the court of Clothar II (dates as référendaire unknown)
- Audoin, Bishop of Rouen (641–689), Grand Référendaire of Dagobert I and Clovis II from 638 to 657
- Robert I, Bishop of Tours, in the courts of Dagobert I and Clovis II (through 663)
- Bonitus, Bishop of Auvergne, in the court of Sigebert III, King of Austrasia
- Robert II, also Chancellor to Clothaire III (through 677).

Undoubtedly, many of the other lord chancellors were also référendaire, but none are recorded as such.

== See also ==
- Merovingian Period−Dynasty topics
- Royal Administration of Merovingian and Carolingian Dynasties.
