= Lambert I =

Lambert I may refer to:

- Lambert of Hesbaye (d. after 650)
- Lambert I of Nantes (d. 836)
- Lambert I of Spoleto (d. 880)
- Lambert I of Louvain (c. 950 – 1015)
- Lamberto I da Polenta (d. 1316)
