= Chrodbert I =

Referendary to Dagobertus

Chrodebert I (Chrotbert, Radobertus, Robert I), Merovingian referendary, son of Charibert de Haspengau and his wife Wulfgurd. Robert and his brothers Erlebert and Aldebert were the ancestors of the Robertians.

Robert began his career as a referendary to Dagobert I and his son Clovis II. He was the Mayor of the Palace of Burgundy from 642 to 662) and possibly that of Neustria during the interregnum of Ebroin. He may have been Bishop of Paris, but there is little evidence to support this.

Robert had two children:

- Lambert I of Hesbaye
- Saint Angadrisma, married to Ansbert of Rouen

Lambert was the grandfather of count palatine Chrodbert.

== Sources ==
- Settipani, Christian, Les Ancêtres de Charlemagne, 2e édition revue et corrigée, éd. P & G, Prosopographia et Genealogica, 2015,
- Settipani, Christian. Addenda aux "Ancêtres de Charlemagne, 1990
