= Chrodbert (count palatine of Chlothar III) =

Son of Lambert of Hesbaye

Chrodbert (also known as Chrodbert II or Robert II to distinguish him from his grandfather known sometimes as Chrodbert I; died after 678) was a nobleman from Neustria. He was grandson to Chrodbert I, referendary to Clovis II through Chrodbert's son Lambert of Hesbaye (died after 650). Chrodbert was referendary during the reign of Chlothar III, King of the Franks in Neustria. He was a contemporary of Ansbert of Rouen. Chrodbert was mentioned as Count palatine (comes palatinus) on 2 October 678.

He was at the court of Clovis II in 654 and opposed Erchinoald, Mayor of the Palace, to little avail. He supported Ebroin against Leodegar, who had the latter’s eyes put out. He became Count palatine and referendary to Clothar III.

Chrodbert married Théodrade (Théoda) and they had many children (though some of the named below may be their grandchildren).

- Chariivius (Hervé), Nobleman of Hesbaye (some say Count of Laon)
- Lambert II, Count of Hesbaye
- Rupert of Salzburg, Bishop of Worms
- Chrotgar, Duke of Le Mans, whose son Charivius has been speculated to have been an ancestor of the Rorgonids
- Ragobert (d. 678)
- Folchaid, married Theodo of Bavaria.

Settipani identifies the first four of these children as the sons of an unnamed son of Chrodbert. However, given the status of these individuals, it seems unlikely that their father would have remained unknown. Grimbert, Count palatine, is credited as being a son of Chrodbert, although there is little evidence to support that. Some histories show Lambert, Count of Hesbaye, as son of Chrodbert, others as the son of Hervé. Chrodbert is typically viewed in scholarly reconstructions to have been a direct ancestor of the Robertians who ruled France from the ninth century.

== Bibliography ==
- Settipani, Christian, Les Ancêtres de Charlemagne, Paris, 1989
- Settipani, Christian, "Addendum to the Ancestors of Charlemagne"
- Gerberding, Richard A., The Rise of the Carolingians and the Liber Historiae Francorum, Oxford University Press, 1987
- Claussen, M. A., The Reform of the Frankish Church: Chrodegang of Metz and the Regula Canonicorum in the Eighth Century, Cambridge University Press, 2004
