= Robert III of Worms =

Frankish noble (800-834)

- Born: 800
- Died: 834 (aged 33–34)
- Noble family: Robertians
- Issue: Guntram, Count of Worms; Robert the Strong
- Father: Robert of Hesbaye

Robert III (800–834), also called Rutpert, was the Count of Worms and Rheingau of a noble Frankish family called the Robertians. It has been proposed that he was the son of Robert of Hesbaye.

== Biography ==
He was the father of Robert the Strong and Guntram, Count of Worms.

His first cousin was Ermengard, wife of the Frankish emperor Louis the Pious. His cousin Chrodogang was Archbishop of Metz and abbot of the Lorsch Abbey.

An uncle of Robert was Count Cancor, founder of Lorsch Abbey. Through Robert the Strong he was grandfather of two kings of Western Francia, Odo and Robert.

== Sources ==
- Riché, Pierre (1983). The Carolingians, a Family that Forged Europe. Translated by Allen, Michael Idomir. University Pennsylvania Press.
