= Lambert, Count of Hesbaye =

Husband of Chrotlind

Lambert was the father of a Frankish noble named Robert, who was described in 741 AD as a "count or duke" in the neighbouring regions of Hesbaye, in what is now northeastern Belgium, and Maasau, which stretches into what is now the Netherlands. No other record about this Lambert exists.

Lambert's own life details and family remains unknown, although it has been proposed based on the use of the names Robert and Lambert that he was the son or paternal grandson of Robert II (Chrodobert II), Lord Chancellor of Francia, and a close relative of his contemporary and namesake, Saint Lambert of Maastricht.

Lambert had at least one son. Other children have been proposed:

- Robert I, Count of Hesbaye, count or duke in Hesbaye and Maasau (Note: Bouchard calls Lambert's son Rupert. See Bouchard 2015, p. 186.)
- Rotrude of Hesbaye, wife of Charles Martel and mother of Carloman (mayor of the palace) and Pepin the Short.
- Possibly Landrade de Hesbaye, who was possibly the mother of Chrodegang

== Sources ==
- Bouchard, Constance Brittain (2015). Rewriting Saints and Ancestors: Memory and Forgetting in France, 500-1200. University of Pennsylvania Press. ISBN 9780812290080.
