= Ingerman, Count of Hesbaye =

Carolingian era Frankish nobleman

Ingerman (Ingram, Enguerrand) (c. 750-818), was a Frankish noble — a count in the Hesbaye region, and son of a brother of Saint Chrodegang, the Bishop of Metz. He was therefore grandson of Sigramnus, another count in the Hesbaye.

== Life ==
Ingram came from a high noble family from Haspengouw near Liège. He was a nephew of Chrodegang, Bishop of Metz.

Ingerman married Rotrude, of unknown parentage. Ingerman and Rotrude had one daughter:

- Ermengarde. She married into the Frankish royal family, the Carolingians and was the first wife of King Louis the Pious, Son of Charlemagne.

== Primary sources mentioning Ingoram ==
There seems to be only one primary source directly mentioning Ingoram.

In a medieval life story of Emperor Louis the Pious, by Thegan of Trier, Louis's wife Ermengarde is said to be a daughter of the noble duke Ingorammus, who was son of a brother of Hruotgangi "sancti pontificis", or in other words Saint Chrodegang.

Chrodegang in turn was named in one medieval record as having parents who were nobles from Hasbania (Hesbaye). Paul the Deacon identified the parents of Chrodegang as Sigram and Landrada.

== Sources ==
- Riché, Pierre (1993). The Carolingians: a Family who Forged Europe. Translated by Allen, Michael Idomir. University of Pennsylvania Press.
- The Henry Project - Sigram https://fasg.org/projects/henryproject/data/sigra000.htm
- Stewart Baldwin, FASG, Todd A. Farmerie, Peter Stewart (2001), The Henry Project The Ancestors of King Henry II of England: An experiment in a cooperative online database for scholarly medieval genealogy https://fasg.org/projects/henryproject/
