= Angadrisma =

7th-century abbess and saint

Saint Angadrisma
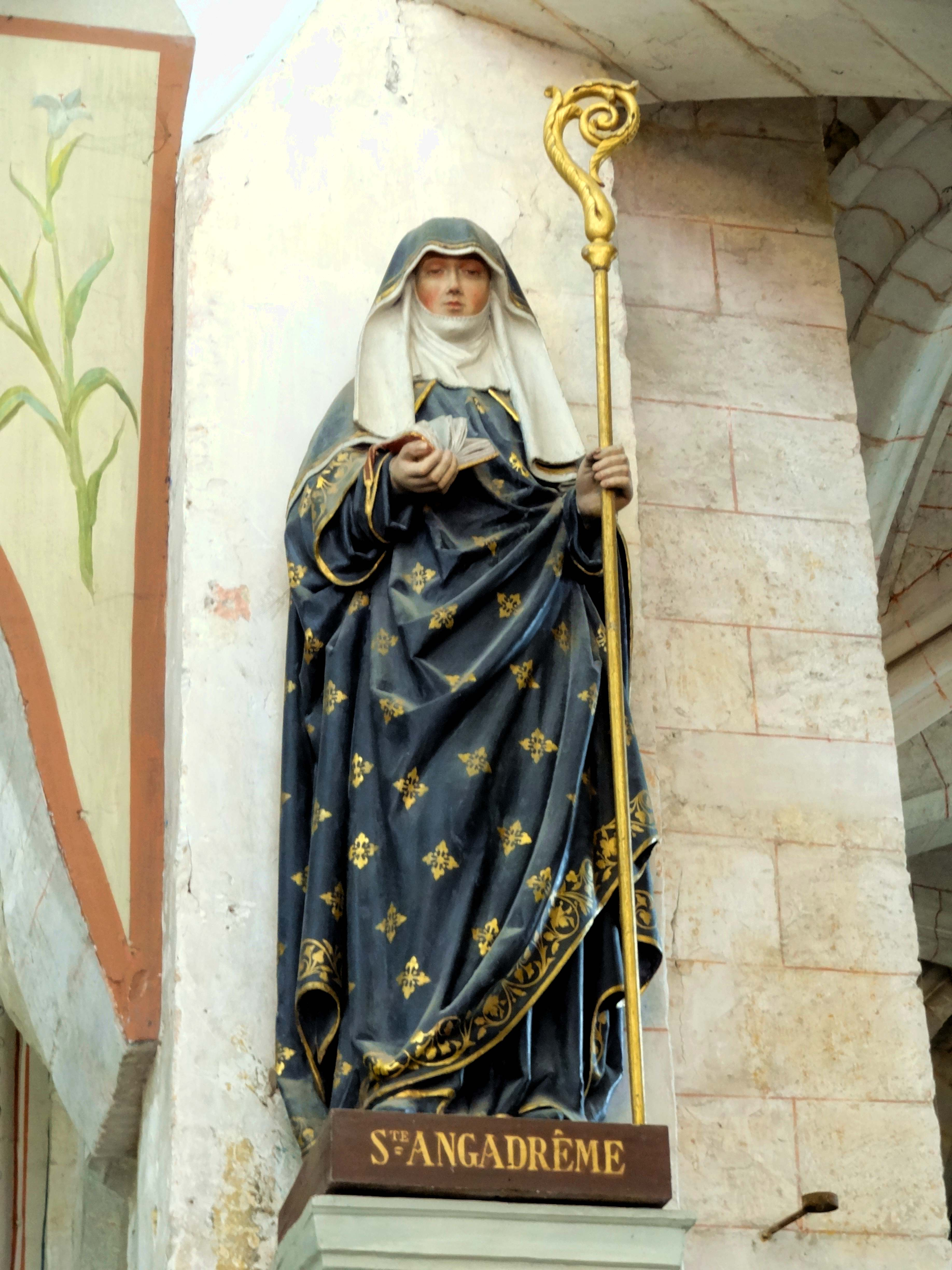
- Died: c. 695
- Venerated in: Roman Catholic Church; Eastern Orthodox Church
- Feast: October 14
- Attributes: Praying leper
- Patronage: Diocese of Beauvais-Noyon-Senlis; invoked against drought and fire

Angadrisma (Angadrême, Angadresima, Angadreme, Angradesma, Andragasyna) (d. ca. 695) was a 7th-century abbess and saint, daughter of Robert I, Bishop of Tours.

== Life ==
Originally from Thérouanne, Angadrisma, belonged to the family of the Counts of Boulogne (Pas-de-Calais). A cousin to Lambert, Bishop of Lyon, she was educated at Thérouanne by Lambert and Saint Audomare (Omer).

Although she wished to become a nun, she was promised in an arranged marriage to Saint Ansbert of Chaussy. Tradition states that Angadrisma, wishing for a way out, prayed fervently and was stricken with leprosy. She was cured when she was allowed to become a nun and received the veil from Saint Ouen, archbishop of Rouen.

Around 660, her father built her a Benedictine monastery in Oroër-des-Vierges, near Beauvais, where she became abbess. She died on 14 October c.695, over 80 years old.

Angadrisma is portrayed in art with her face pitted by leprous skin. She is venerated as the patron of the diocese of Beauvais.
