= Bonitus (bishop) =

7th-century French bishop and saint

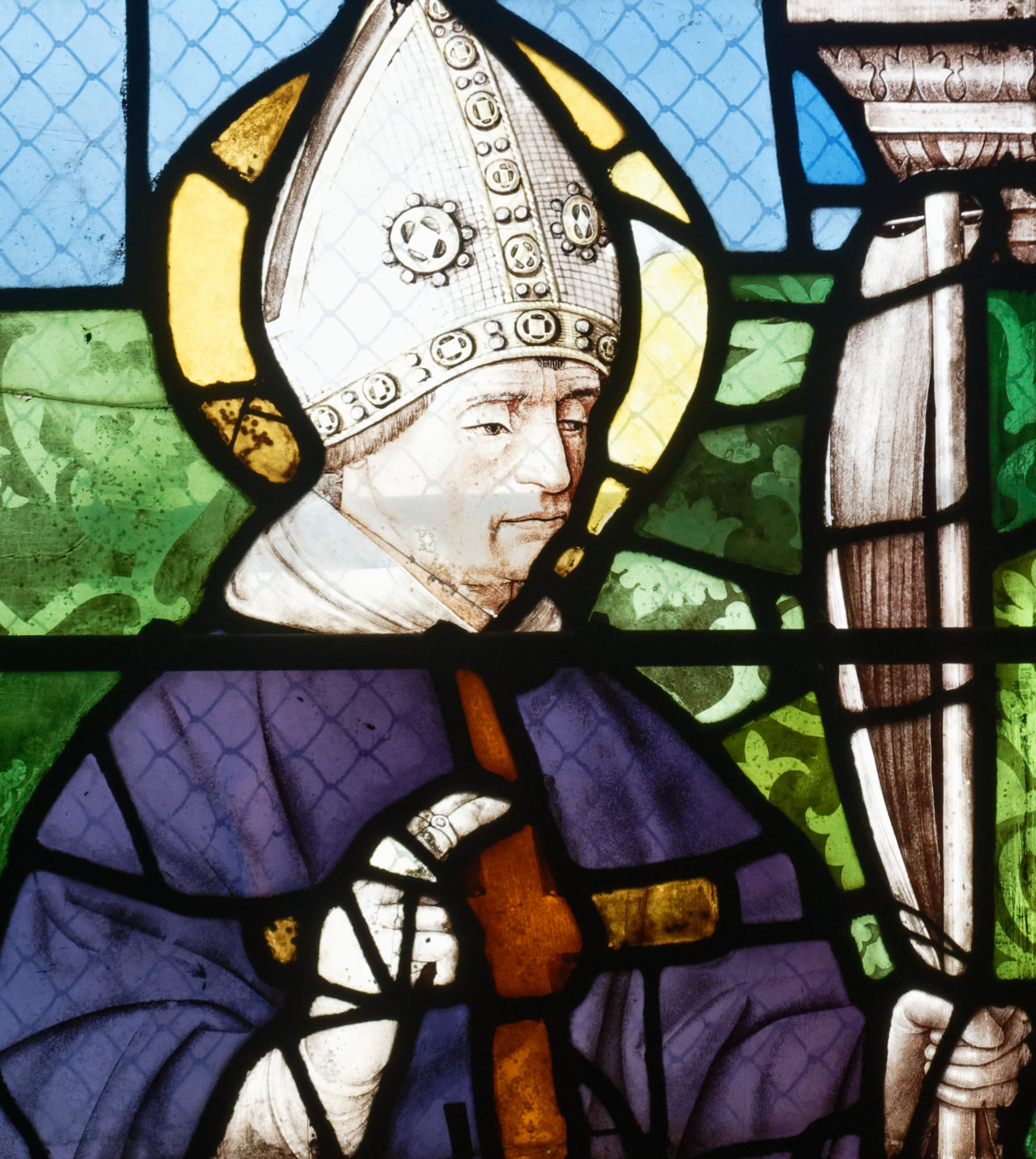
St. Bonitus of Clermont

Saint Bonitus (623–710) was born in France and held a number of important positions including being appointed governor of Marseille in 667 and Bishop of Auvergne. He was also chancellor and referendary in Francia. He is venerated as a saint in the Eastern Orthodox Church and Roman Catholic Church.

== Life ==
Bonitus was born in Auvergne, France to a family of former Roman senators. He became chancellor to Sigebert III. the king of Austrasia; and by his zeal, religion, and justice, flourished in that kingdom under four kings. After the death of Dagobert II. Thierry III. made him governor of Marseille and all Provence, in 680. He was known to be an intimate friend of Sigebert III and Genesius.

His elder brother St. Avitus II, bishop of Clermont, in Auvergne, having recommended him for his successor, died in 689, and Bonitus was consecrated. He was known to have a great devotion to the Blessed Virgin Mary and is said to have experienced an apparition of her. Two years later, after having governed that see ten years, he had a scruple whether his election had been perfectly canonical; and having consulted St. Tilo, or Theau, then leading an eremitical life at Solignas, resigned his dignity.

He retired for four years to the abbey of Manlieu, and made a pilgrimage to Rome.

He died of gout at Lyons on 15 January 710, being 86 years old. He was buried in the cathedral at Clermont; however some relics were taken to Paris and held at three churches there.
