= Thuringbert, Count of Hesbaye =

Frankish count (c. 735–770)

Thuringbert (c. 735–770), Count in Wormsgau, was a brother of Cancor, a count who was associated with the Abbey of Lorsch. He was therefore possibly a son of Cancor's mother Williswinda and perhaps her only known husband, who was named Robert, and may therefore have been the Robert, who was Count or Duke in the Hesbaye.

Thuringbert and his wife (name unknown) had one child:

- Robert

Thuringbert was succeeded as Count of Hesbaye by his son Robert.

== Primary records defining Thurincbert ==
The only primary records mentioning Thurincbert describe him as a brother of Count Cancor, and father of a man named Robert. Cancor was a son of a woman named Williswinda.

== Sources ==
- Bouchard, Constance Brittain (2015). Rewriting Saints and Ancestors: Memory and Forgetting in France, 500-1200. University of Pennsylvania Press. ISBN 9780812290080.
