= Sigramnus, Count of Hesbaye =

Sigramnus (Sigrand) The only knowledge available on Sigramnus is through his son, the Bishop of Metz, and grandson Ingerman of Hesbaye, father of Ermengard, wife of Louis the Pious. Sigramnus is known to have been an early supporter of Charles Martel, before the Battle of Amblève.

Sigramnus married Landrada.

They had:

- Saint Chrodegang, Bishop of Metz (d 766.)
- Gundeland, monk at Gorze (d 778 or 9.)
- Son, name unknown, father of Ingerman, Count of Hesbaye.

Previous histories have portrayed Sigramnus as the husband of the daughter of Charles Martel, but this has been largely discredited.

== Sources ==
- Bouchard, Constance Brittain (2015). Rewriting Saints and Ancestors: Memory and Forgetting in France, 500-1200. University of Pennsylvania Press.
- Claussen, M. A. (2004). The Reform of the Frankish Church: Chrodegang of Metz and the Regula Canonicorum in the Eighth Century. Cambridge: Cambridge University Press.
