= Chrodegang =

8th-century Frankish Bishop of Metz and Catholic saint

Saint Chrodegang
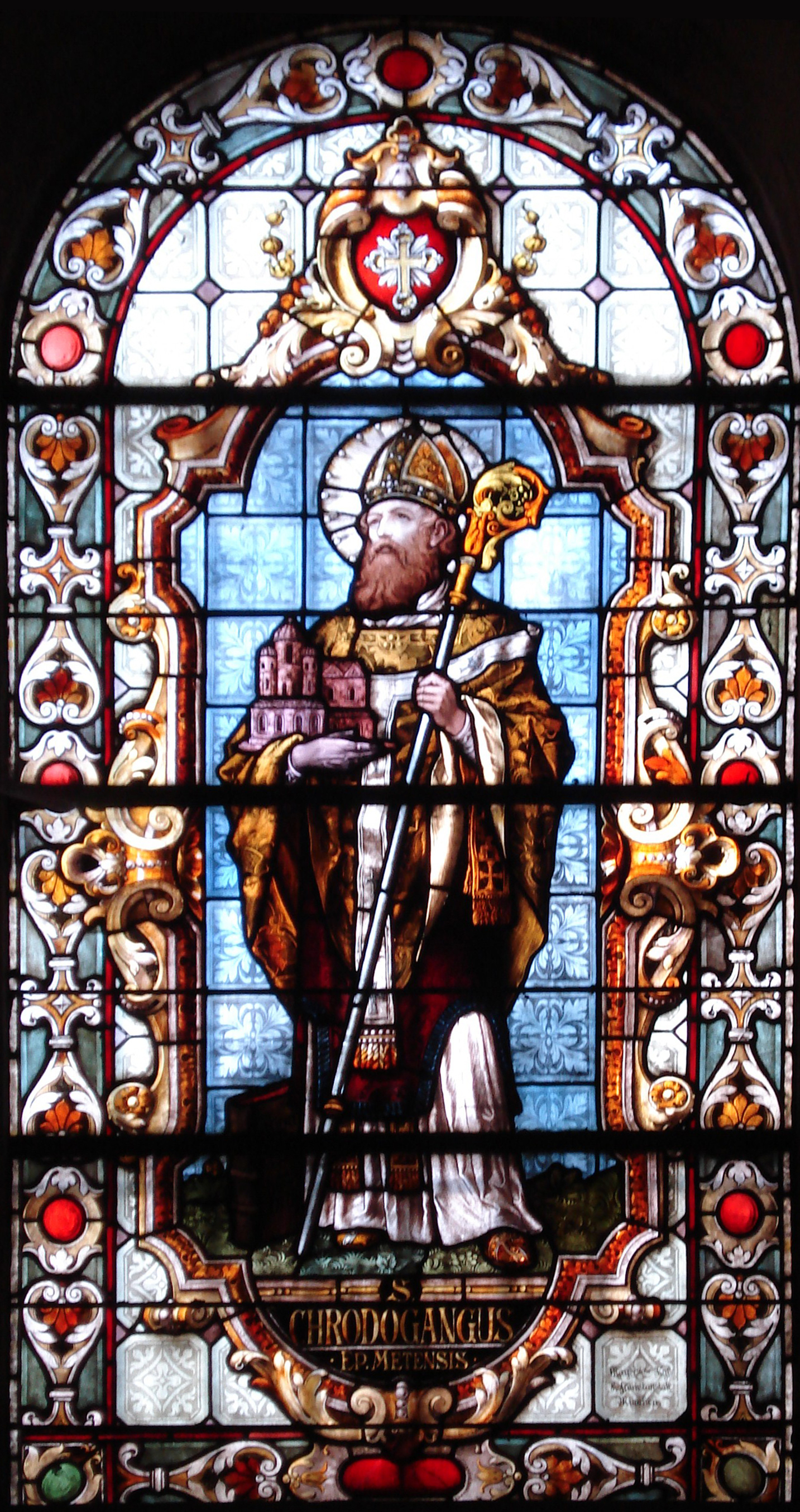
- Born: c. 712; Hesbaye (modern Belgium), Dioecesis Leodiensis, Austrasia, Kingdom of the Franks
- Died: March 6, 766; Metz, Kingdom of the Franks
- Venerated in: Catholic Church; Eastern Orthodox Church
- Major shrine: Gorze Abbey
- Feast: March 6

Chrodegang (Latin: Chrodogangus; German: Chrodegang, Hruotgang; (Note: Spellings of his name in (Latin) primary sources are extremely varied: Chrodegangus, Grodegandus, Grodegangus, Grodogangus, Chrodogandus, Krodegandus, Chrodegrangus, Chrotgangus, Ruotgangus, Droctegangus, Chrodegand, and Sirigangus. In English it is also found as Godegrand, Gundigran, Ratgang, Rodigang, and Sirigang.) died 6 March 766) was the Frankish Bishop of Metz from 742 or 748 until his death. He served as chancellor for his kinsman, Charles Martel. Chrodegang is claimed to be a progenitor of the Frankish dynasty of the Robertians. He is recognized as a saint in the Catholic Church and in the Orthodox Church.

== Biography ==
He was born in the early eighth century at Hesbaye (Belgium, around the old Roman civitas of Tongeren) of a noble Frankish family, possibly the son of Sigramnus, Count of Hesbaye, and Landrada, daughter of Lambert II, Count of Hesbaye. Landrada was the sister of Rotrude of Hesbaye, Charles Martel's first wife.

He was educated first at the monastery of Saint-Trond, one of the oldest and most powerful abbeys in the Low Countries, and then at the cathedral school of Metz. At the court of Charles Martel, became his referendary, then chancellor, and in 737 prime minister. Sometime after 742, he was appointed to succeed Sigibald as Bishop of Metz, while still retaining his civil office.

In 753 he met and escorted Pope Stephen II when the pontiff visited France to seek help against Lombard incursions. As apostolic delegate to the Frankish kingdom, he was directly involved in the coronation of Pepin in 754 and the subsequent defeat of the Longbard king Aistulf. He accompanied the pope to Ponthieu.

After the death of Saint Boniface, Pope Stephen conferred the pallium on Saint Chrodegang (754–755), thus making him an archbishop, but not elevating the See of Metz. In 762, during a dangerous illness, he introduced among his priests a confraternity of prayer known as the League of Attigny. Chrodegang was well versed in Latin and the native early Old High German. He died at Metz on 6 March 766 and was buried in Gorze Abbey, the site of his principal shrine.

== Reform ==
According to M.A. Claussen, "Chrodegang's work lay at the foundation of the Carolingian spiritual revival of later eighth and ninth centuries." In 748 he founded Gorze Abbey (near Metz). He also established St. Peter's Abbey on the Moselle, and did much for the abbeys of Gengenbach and Lorsch. For the latter he is said to have obtained the relics of Saint Nazarius, and for Gorze those of Saint Gorgonius. In his diocese he introduced the Roman Liturgy and musical chant, and also enriched community life for the canons of his cathedral.

=== Rule of Chrodegang ===
Around 755, he wrote a special rule for them, the Regula Canonicorum, later known as 'Rule of Chrodegang'. The rule, containing thirty-four chapters, was based on the Rule of St. Benedict. Its purpose, however, was principally pastoral: to encourage the mutual support of a community as found in a monastic setting, while recognizing the very different responsibilities of canons serving the spiritual needs of the faithful. Chrodegang necessarily adapted the Benedictine rule, particularly in regards to the hospitality characteristic of monasteries, and the care of the sick as there were neither guest houses nor hospices at cathedrals.

The rule was widely circulated and gave an important impulse to the spread of community life among the secular clergy. In 816, it was incorporated in part into the Institutio canonicorum Aquisgranensis established by the Council of Aachen. By the eleventh and twelfth centuries, the Rule of Chrodegang was gradually supplanted by more popular rules based on Augustine.

It seems probable that the Rule of Chrodegang was brought by Irish monks to their native land from the monasteries of north-eastern Gaul, and that Irish anchorites originally unfettered by the rules of the cloister bound themselves by it. The Rule of Céli Dé, which is preserved in the Leabhar Breac, and has been attributed to Máel Ruain, was possibly written in the 9th century by one of his community. The Rule "...is more a canonical than a monastic rule, and analogous to Chrodegang of Metz's Regula Canonicorum."

In the course of the 9th century mention is made of nine places in Ireland (including Armagh, Clonmacnoise, Clones, Devenish and Sligo) where communities of Culdees were established as a kind of annex to the regular monastic institutions. They seem especially to have had the care of the poor and the sick, and were interested in the musical part of worship.

== See also ==
- Benedict of Aniane
- Máel Ruain -his rules for the Culdees
- Wulfred -on reforming the canons at Canterbury Cathedral

== Sources ==
- D'Achéry, Spicilegium, I, 656
