= Ansbert of Rouen =

Frankish Benedictine abbot and saint

Saint Ansbert of Rouen
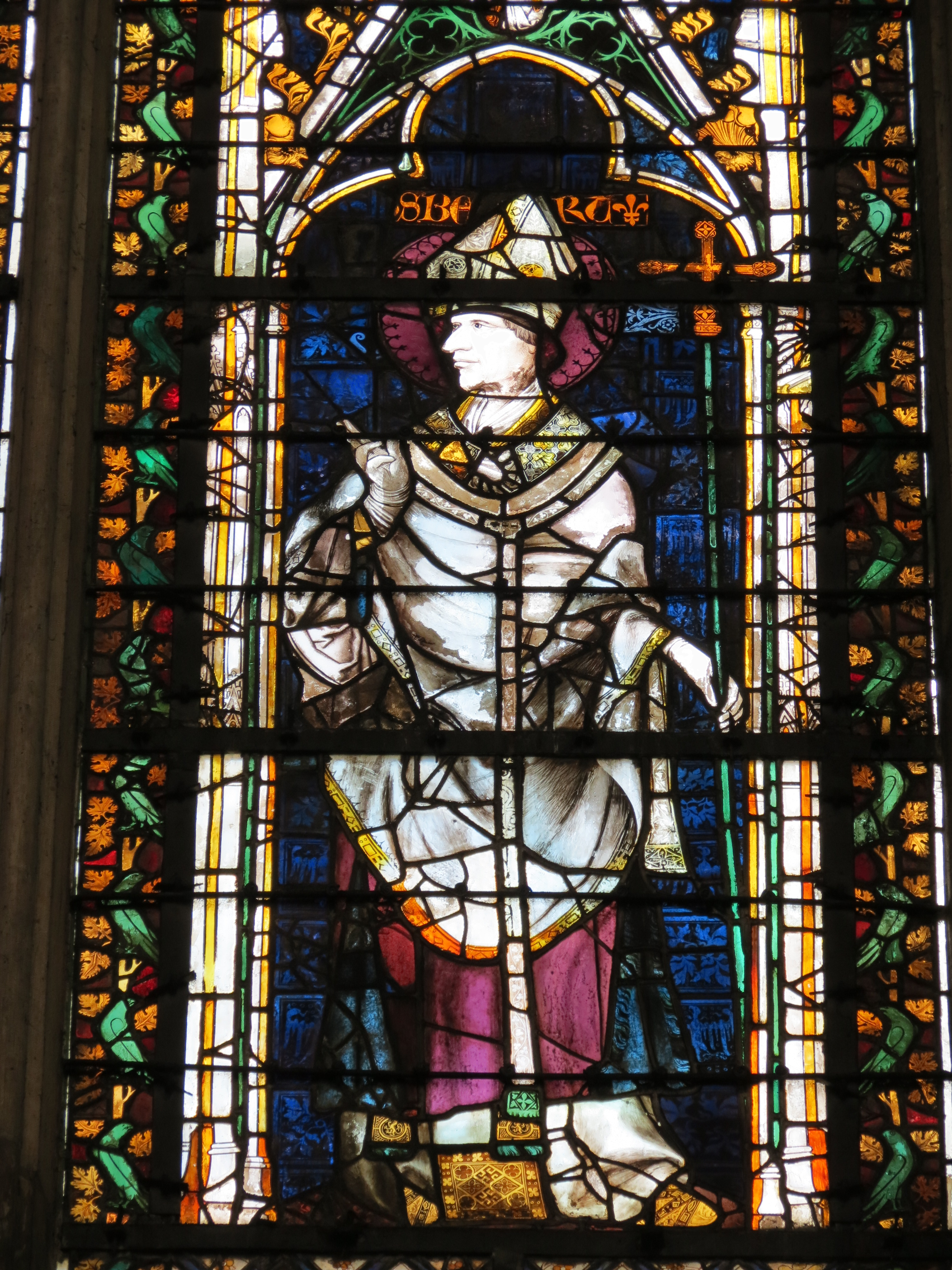
- Portrait of Ansbert in stained glass at Rouen Cathedral
- Born: Chaussy-sur-Epte
- Died: c. 695; Hautmont
- Venerated in: Roman Catholic Church, Eastern Orthodox Church
- Canonized: Pre-Congregation
- Feast: 9 February

Ansbert (died c. 695), sometimes called Ansbert of Chaussy, was a Frankish monk, abbot and bishop of Rouen, today regarded as a saint in the Catholic Church and Eastern Orthodox Church.

== Early life ==
Ansbert was born at Chaussy-sur-Epte, a village in the Norman historical area known as the Vexin. He was born to a noble family, and was highly educated. He had a significant professional career, and is said to have served as a senior member of the court of the Merovingian king, Clotaire III. As such, he was both chancellor and referendary.

Ansbert was engaged to be married to another future saint, Angadrisma. Her father, said to have been another of Clotaire's chancellors, arranged for her to wed his colleague, but Angadrisma – later a patroness of nuns – prayed for release from this obligation. Tradition states that dispensation was given to her after she was "struck down with leprosy", a disfiguring malady which only disappeared when she joined a convent. Some sources state that Ansbert later took a different bride.

== Religious vocation ==
In 673, the same year Clotaire died, Ansbert renounced his secular pursuits and became a monk of the Benedictine order. Six years later, he was elevated to abbot of his monastery, the illustrious Fontenelle Abbey. He followed two other saints in that office: Wandrille, the abbey's founder and first abbot, and Lambert, the second abbot, who vacated the office when he was named bishop of Lyon. Under his leadership, Fontenelle prospered. His enterprises included a great expansion and refinement of the abbey's library, and the establishment of local hospitals for the poor.

During his time as abbot, Ansbert served as the confessor to King Theodoric III. After several years, Ansbert was appointed archbishop of Rouen following the death of the previous officeholder, Saint Ouen, in 683 or 684. His former mentor Saint Lambert performed his consecration, and Ansbert was succeeded as abbot at Fontenelle by Hildebert (d. 701), who is also venerated as a saint.

Despite his high office and eminent reputation, Ansbert was removed from the bishopric around the year 690. By "a false accusation", the powerful majordomo of the Frankish court, Pepin of Heristal, arranged his dismissal, either because of some kind of political opposition or because Ansbert's "zeal was not well-received" and "his austere life caused offence". He was sent into exile at Hautmont Abbey where he stayed until his death, sometime between 692 and 695. At some time Pepin apparently reconsidered his actions and agreed to allow Ansbert to return, but either he changed his mind again or Ansbert died before making the trip.

After his death, Ansbert's body was transferred to Fontanelle, where witnesses claimed the following:

"When they had opened his tomb and they thought his body would stink because of the amount of time that had elapsed since it had been buried, such a sweet fragrant odor like a diversity of flowers flowed forth, and the whole church was filled with little drops of balsam. And when the brothers who had come to see him from the neighboring province... removed the clothes in which he had been buried because they wanted to change them wishing to dress him in new clothes, they found on his forearms the sign of the dominical cross, bearing the likeness of a red color. It was evident to all the faithful that this was given to be understood that while he lived he bore the arms of Christ in his heart, therefore, Christ's stigmata were revealed on the body of the dead man."

== Legacy ==
The 12th-century chronicler Ordericus Vitalis relays a tale in which it was said that Ansbert's remains were desecrated and dispersed by soldiers of Hugh the Great. He asserts that the bones in question belonged to a different Ansbert, and that those of the saint were, at the time of his writing, still preserved safely at Fontenelle Abbey. The 18th-century author Alban Butler, however, states that the remains were at some point transferred to St. Peter's Abbey in Ghent, where they were destroyed by Calvinists in 1578.

A collective day of remembrance for all the many saints associated with Fontenelle Abbey is celebrated on 1 March. Saint Ansbert's own annual feast day is 9 February.
