= Robert I of Hesbaye =

Count or duke in Hasbania

Robert I or Rupert (c. 697 – 758) was a count or duke in the Hesbaye region. His father's name is known to be Lambert.

It has been proposed that this is the same Robert who married Williswinda who founded Lorsch Abbey. This Williswinda had three children:

- Count Cancor (died 771)
- Anselm (killed in battle in Roncesvalles, Spain, 778), Count Palatine
- Thuringbert

== Primary sources ==
In a charter of 741/2 which exists in several versions, wherein a Robert, son of Lambert, Count or Duke of the "pago Hasbaniensi et Masuarinsi", the land of Hasbanians and Masuarians, granted lands near Diest to Sint-Truiden Abbey.

The third continuation of the Gesta Abbatum Trudonensium, in its report of the charter, describes Robert as Robertus comes vel dux Hasbanie ("count or Duke of Hasbania").

This Robert, the Gesta says, is also the one mentioned as a Duke in the medieval biography (Vita) of Bishop Eucherius of Orléans. When Charles Martel exiled Eucherius to Cologne this was under the custody of the said Duke Robert of Hasbania (Hasbanio Chrodoberto duce).

The connection to Williswinda has been proposed by some historians because her late husband had the name Robert, as is mentioned only once in the Necrology of Lorsch abbey.

== Sources ==
- Despy, G (1961), "La charte de 741-742 du comte Robert de Hesbaye pour l'abbaye de Saint-Trond" (PDF), Annales du XXXVIIe Congrès de la Fédération Archéologique et Historique de Belgique, Bruxelles, 24-30 Août 1958: 82–91
- Bouchard, Constance Brittain (2015). Rewriting Saints and Ancestors: Memory and Forgetting in France, 500-1200. University of Pennsylvania Press. ISBN 9780812290080.
