= Saint-Domingue =

French colony on the island of Hispaniola (1659–1803)

- 1697–1803
- Flag before the French Revolution Royal Coat of Arms of the Kingdom of France
- Anthem: Marche Henri IV (1697–1792) La Marseillaise (1792–1803)
- Map of the French colony of Saint-Domingue in 1777, after the Treaty of Aranjuez
- Status: Colony of France
- Capital: Cap-Français (1711–1770); Port-au-Prince (1770–1803); 19°06′00″N 72°20′00″W
- Common languages: French, Creole French, American English
- Religion: Catholicism, Haitian Vodou
- Demonym: Creole
- King
  - 1697–1715: Louis XIV
  - 1715–1774: Louis XV
  - 1774-1792: Louis XVI
- Governor
  - 1697–1700 (first): Jean Du Casse
  - 1802–1803 (last): Vicomte de Rochambeau
- History
  - Ceded by Spain: 1697
  - Independence: 1803

Area
  - Total: 21,550 km^{2} (8,320 sq mi)

Population
  - 1789 estimate: 556,000
- Currency: Saint-Domingue livre
Preceded by	Succeeded by
Captaincy General of Santo Domingo	First Empire of Haiti
- Today part of: Haiti

Saint-Domingue (French: [sɛ̃ dɔmɛ̃ɡ]) was a French colony in the western portion of the Caribbean island of Hispaniola, in the area of modern-day Haiti, from 1659 to 1803. The name derives from the Spanish main city on the island, Santo Domingo, which came to refer specifically to the Spanish-held Captaincy General of Santo Domingo, now the Dominican Republic. The borders between the two were fluid and changed over time until they were finally solidified in the Dominican War of Independence in 1844.

The French had established themselves on the western portion of the islands of Hispaniola and Tortuga thanks to the Devastations of Osorio. In the Treaty of Ryswick of 1697, Spain formally recognized French control of Tortuga Island and the western third of the island of Hispaniola. In 1791, Africans, who had been forced into bondage, and some Creoles took part in a Vodou ceremony at Bois Caïman and planned the Haitian Revolution. The rebellion later allied with Republican French forces following the abolition of slavery in the colony in 1793, although this alienated the island's white population that benefited from free labor. France controlled the entirety of Hispaniola from 1795 to 1802, when a renewed rebellion began. The last French troops withdrew from the western portion of the island in late 1803, and the colony later declared its independence as Haiti, derived from the Taíno name for the island, the following year.

== Overview ==
Spain controlled the entire island of Hispaniola from the 1490s until the 17th century, when French pirates began establishing bases on the western side of the island. The official name was La Española, meaning "The Spanish (Island)". It was also called Santo Domingo, after Saint Dominic.

The western part of Hispaniola was neglected by the Spanish authorities, and French buccaneers began to settle first on the island of Tortuga, then on the northwest of Hispaniola. Spain later ceded the entire western coast of the island to France, retaining the rest of the island, including the Guava Valley, today known as the Central Plateau.

The French called their portion of Hispaniola Saint-Domingue, the French equivalent of Santo Domingo. The Spanish colony on Hispaniola remained separate, and eventually became the Dominican Republic, the capital of which is still named Santo Domingo.

== History ==
=== The division of Hispaniola ===
When Christopher Columbus took possession of the island in 1492, he named it Insula Hispana, meaning "the Spanish island" in Latin. As Spain conquered new regions on the mainland of the Americas (Spanish Main), its interest in Hispaniola waned, and the colony's population grew slowly. By the early 17th century, the island and its smaller neighbors, notably Tortuga, had become regular stopping points for Caribbean pirates. In 1605 Philip III of Spain ordered Governor Antonio de Osorio to depopulate the western, central and northern regions of Hispaniola in order to stop smuggling between local colonists and the French, English and Dutch. Rather than securing the island, this resulted in French, English and Dutch pirates establishing bases on the now-abandoned north and west coasts of the island.

French buccaneers established a settlement on the island of Tortuga in 1625 before going to Grande Terre (the mainland). At first they survived by pirating ships, eating wild cattle and hogs, and selling hides to traders of all nations. Although the Spanish destroyed the buccaneers' settlements several times, on each occasion they returned, drawn by the abundance of natural resources: hardwood trees, wild hogs and cattle, and fresh water. The settlement on Tortuga was officially established in 1659 under the commission of King Louis XIV.

In 1665, French colonization of the islands of Hispaniola and Tortuga entailed slavery-based plantation agricultural activity such as growing coffee and cattle farming. It was officially recognized by King Louis XIV. Spain tacitly recognized the French presence in the western third of the island in the 1697 Peace of Ryswick; the Spanish deliberately omitted direct reference to the island from the treaty, but they were never able to reclaim this territory from the French.

=== Economy ===
Map of the French colony of Saint-Domingue, in 1777. To the east, is the Captaincy General of Santo Domingo (territory of Spain). The border that divides the Island on the map, is the border agreed between France and Spain in the Treaty of Aranjuez of 1777. At first, the entire island of Hispaniola belonged to Spain, but the French managed to seize the western part of the island thanks to the Devastations of Osorio (1605–1606).

The economy of Saint-Domingue became focused on slave-based agricultural plantations. Saint-Domingue's Black population quickly increased. They followed the example of neighboring Caribbean colonies in coercive treatment of the slaves. More cattle and slave agricultural holdings, coffee plantations and spice plantations were implemented, as well as fishing, cultivation of cocoa, coconuts, and snuff. Saint-Domingue quickly came to overshadow the previous colony in both wealth and population.

Nicknamed the "Pearl of the Antilles," Saint-Domingue became the richest and most prosperous French colony in the West Indies, cementing its status as an important port in the Americas for goods and products flowing to and from France and Europe. Thus, the income and the taxes from slave-based sugar production became a major source of the French budget.

Among the first buccaneers was Bertrand d'Ogeron (1613–1676), who played a big part in the settlement of Saint-Domingue. He encouraged the planting of tobacco, which turned a population of buccaneers and freebooters, who had not acquiesced to royal authority until 1660, into a sedentary population. D'Ogeron also attracted many colonists from Martinique and Guadeloupe, including Jean Roy, Jean Hebert and his family, and Guillaume Barre and his family, who were driven out by the land pressure which was generated by the extension of the sugar plantations in those colonies. But in 1670, shortly after Cap-Français (later Cap-Haïtien) had been established, the crisis of tobacco intervened and a great number of places were abandoned. The rows of freebooting grew bigger; plundering raids, like those of Vera Cruz in 1683 or of Campêche in 1686, became increasingly numerous, and Jean-Baptiste Colbert, Marquis de Seignelay, elder son of Jean Baptist Colbert and at the time Minister of the Navy, brought back some order by taking a great number of measures, including the creation of plantations of indigo and of cane sugar. The first sugar windmill was built in 1685.

On 22 July 1795, Spain ceded to France the remaining Spanish part of the island of Hispaniola, Santo Domingo (now the Dominican Republic), in the second Treaty of Basel, ending the War of the Pyrenees. The people of the eastern part of Saint-Domingue (French Santo Domingo) were opposed to the arrangements and hostile toward the French. The islanders revolted against their new masters and a state of anarchy ensued, leading to more French troops being brought in.

Until the mid-18th century, there were efforts made by the French Crown to found a stable French-European population in the colony, a difficult task because there were few European women there. From the 17th century to the mid-18th century, the Crown attempted to remedy this by sending women from France to Saint-Domingue and Martinique to marry the settlers. However, these women were rumoured to be former prostitutes from La Salpêtrière and the settlers complained about the system in 1713, stating that the women sent were not suitable, a complaint that was repeated in 1743. The system was consequently abandoned, and with it the plans for colonisation. In the later half of the 18th century, it became common and accepted that a Frenchman during his stay of a few years would cohabitate with a local black female.

An early death among Europeans was very common due to diseases and conflicts; the French soldiers that Napoleon sent in 1802 to quell the revolt in Saint-Domingue were attacked by yellow fever during the Haitian Revolution, and more than half of the French army died of disease.

=== Saint-Domingue colony ===
==== Plantation economy ====
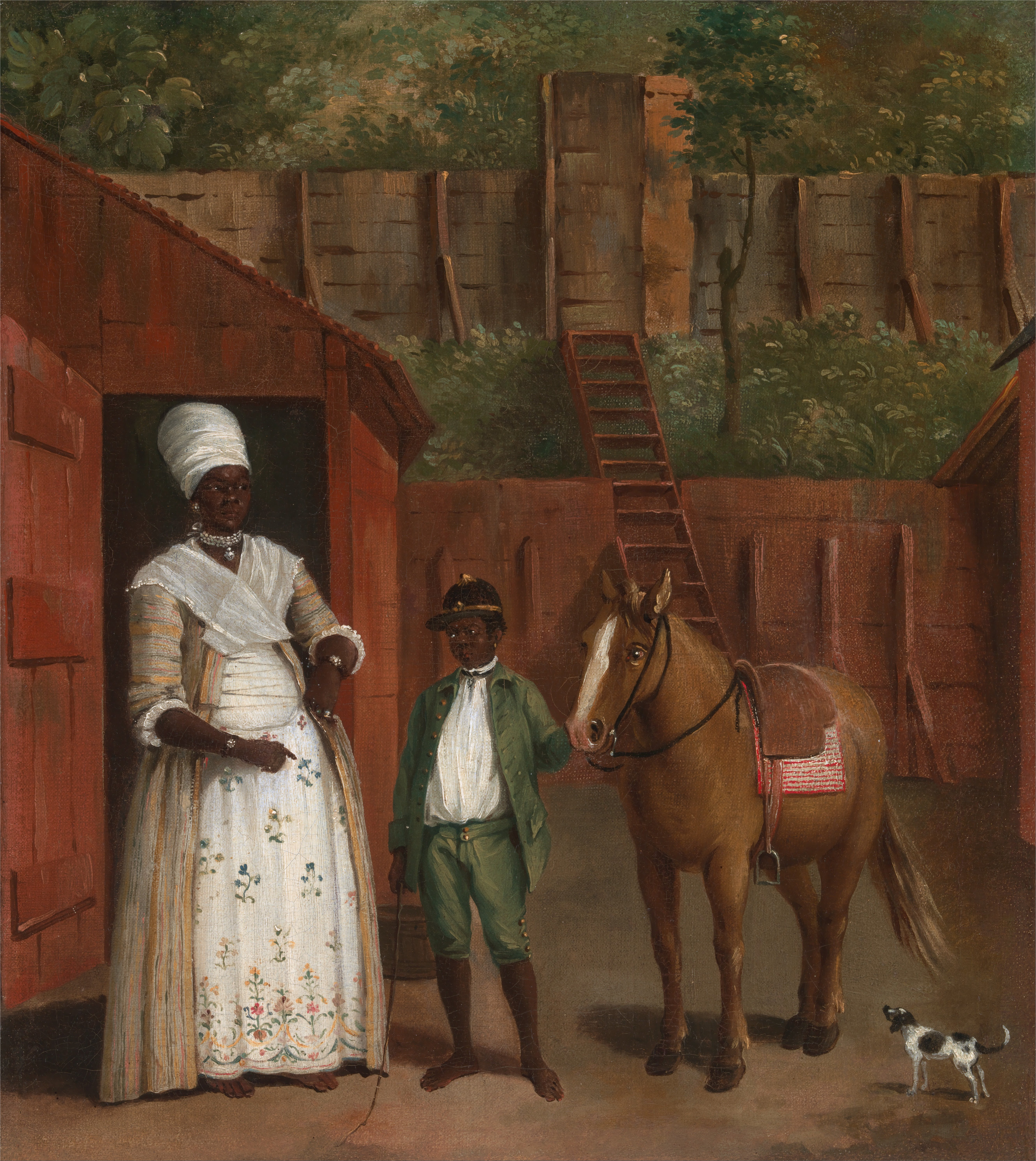
A Creole servant boy and his mother

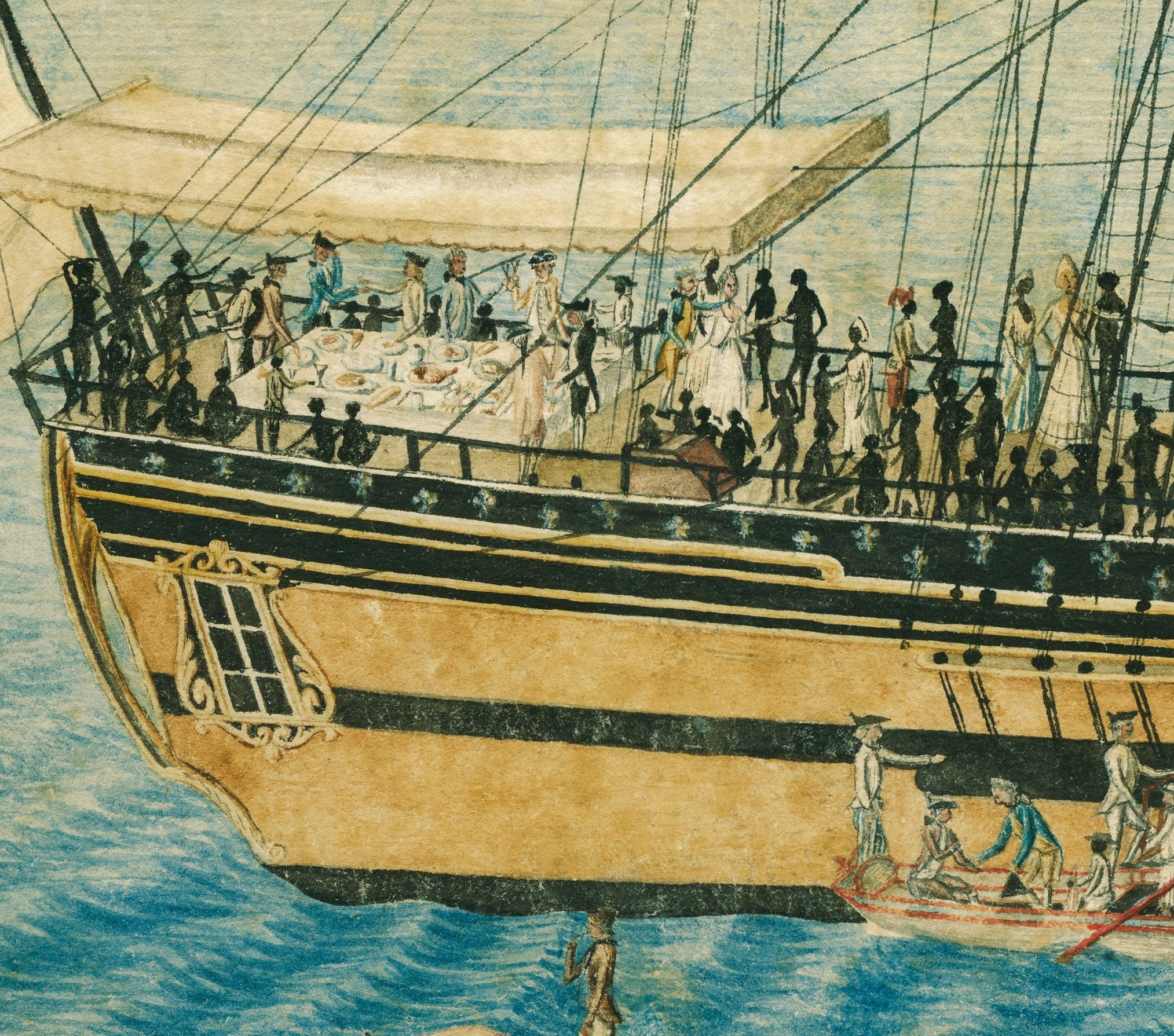
Drawing of a slave sale aboard the Marie Séraphique in the waters off Cap‑Français, 1773

Prior to the Seven Years' War (1756–1763), the economy of Saint-Domingue gradually expanded, with sugar and, later, coffee becoming important export crops. After the war, which disrupted maritime commerce, the colony underwent rapid expansion. In 1767, it exported 72 million pounds of raw sugar and 51 million pounds of refined sugar, one million pounds of indigo, and two million pounds of cotton. Saint-Domingue became known as the "Pearl of the Antilles" – one of the richest colonies in the world in the 18th-century French empire. It was the greatest jewel in imperial France's mercantile crown. By the 1780s, Saint-Domingue produced about 40 percent of all the sugar and 60 percent of all the coffee consumed in Europe. By 1789, Saint Domingue was made up of about 8,000 plantations ..., producing one-half of all the sugar and coffee that was consumed in Europe and the Americas. This single colony, roughly the size of Hawaiʻi or Belgium, produced more sugar and coffee than all of the British West Indies colonies combined, generating enormous revenue for the French government and enhancing its power.

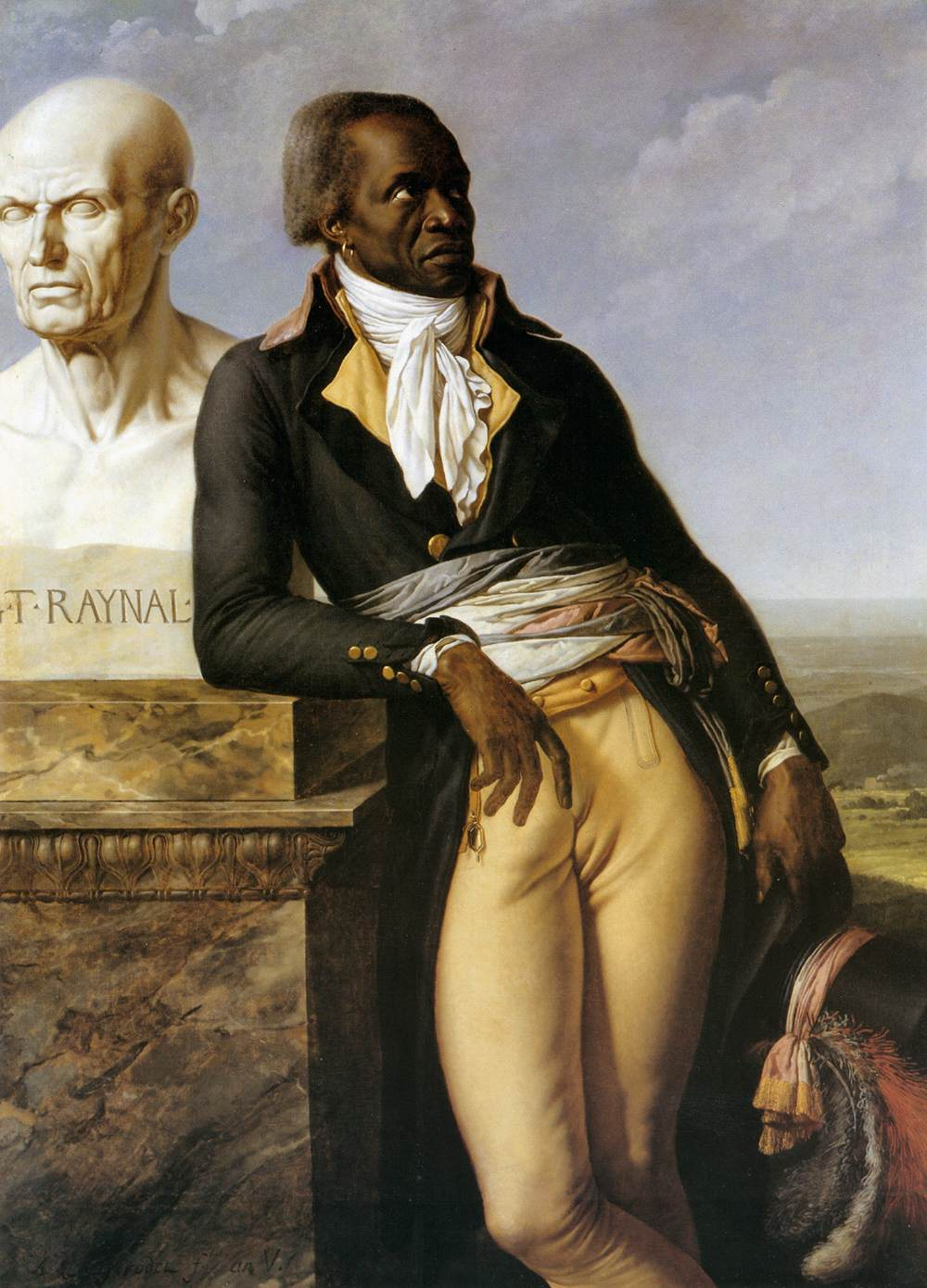
Jean-Baptiste Belley, an affranchi who became a rich planter, elected member of the Estates General for Saint-Domingue, and later Deputy of the French National Convention

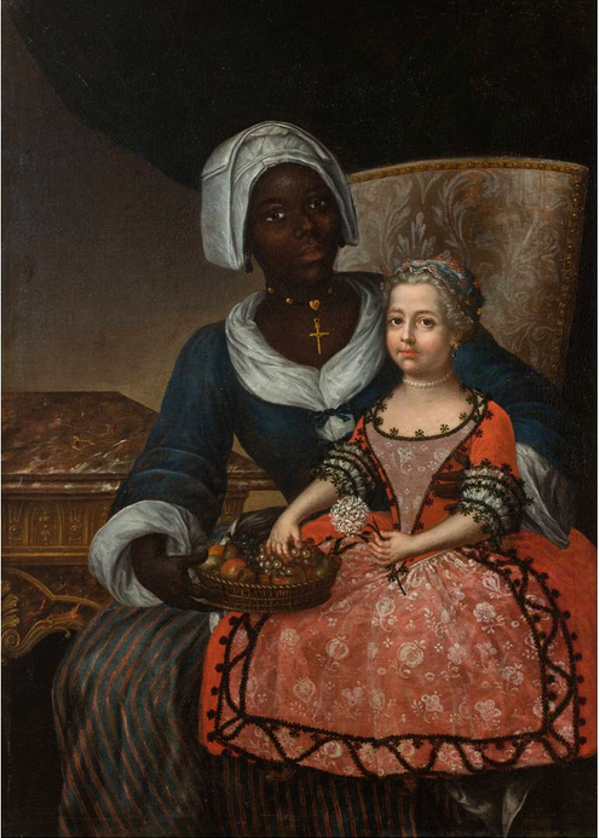
A Creole girl with her nanny

Between 1681 and 1791 the labor for these plantations was provided by an estimated 790,000 or 860,000 slaves, accounting in 1783–1791 for a third of the entire Atlantic slave trade. In addition, some Native Americans were enslaved in Louisiana and sent to Saint-Domingue, particularly in the wake of the Natchez revolt. Between 1764 and 1771, the average annual importation of African slaves varied between 10,000 and 15,000; by 1786 it was about 28,000, and from 1787 onward, the colony received more than 30,000 slaves a year.

The inability to maintain slave numbers without constant resupply from Africa meant that at all times, a majority of slaves in the colony were African-born, as specific conditions of slavery and exposure to tropical diseases such as yellow fever prevented the population from experiencing growth through natural increase. Slave traders ventured along the Atlantic coast of Africa, buying slaves for plantation labor; most of the slaves they bought were war-captives and enslaved by an opposing African ethnic group. The slaves that they purchased came from hundreds of different tribes; their languages often were mutually incomprehensible, and they learned Creole French to communicate.

The slave population around 1789 totaled to 406,000 (according to Jacques Pierre Brissot) or 465,000, while there were 28,000 to 32,000 affranchis (ex-slaves) and Creole of color population who numbered about 28,000 or 32,000. Whites totaled to be around 40,000 to 45,000 whites which included its largest group being the Petits blancs (white commoners; lit: little whites) and Creoles of lighter complexions; French subjects: engagés (white indentured servants), foreign European immigrants or refugees, and a small exclusive group of Grands blancs (white nobles; lit: big whites) of whom the majority lived or were born in France.

There were numerous kinds of plantations in Saint-Domingue. Some planters produced indigo, cotton, and coffee; these plantations were small in scale, and usually only had 15–30 slaves, creating an intimate work environment. However, the most valuable plantations produced sugar. The average sugar plantation employed 300 slaves, and the largest sugar plantation on record employed 1400 slaves. These plantations took up only 14% of Saint-Domingue's cultivated land; comparatively, coffee was 50% of all cultivated land, indigo was 22%, and cotton only 5%. Because of the comparative investment requirement between sugar plantations and all other plantation types, there was a big economic gap between normal planters and sugar "lords."

While grands blancs owned 800 large-scale sugar plantations, the petits blancs and gens de couleur (people of color) owned 11,700 small scale plantations, of which petits blancs owned 5,700 plantations, counting 3,000 indigo, 2,000 coffee, and 700 cotton; the affranchis and Creoles of color owned 6,000 plantations that mainly produced coffee of which they held an economic monopoly.

=== Saint-Domingue Creole society ===
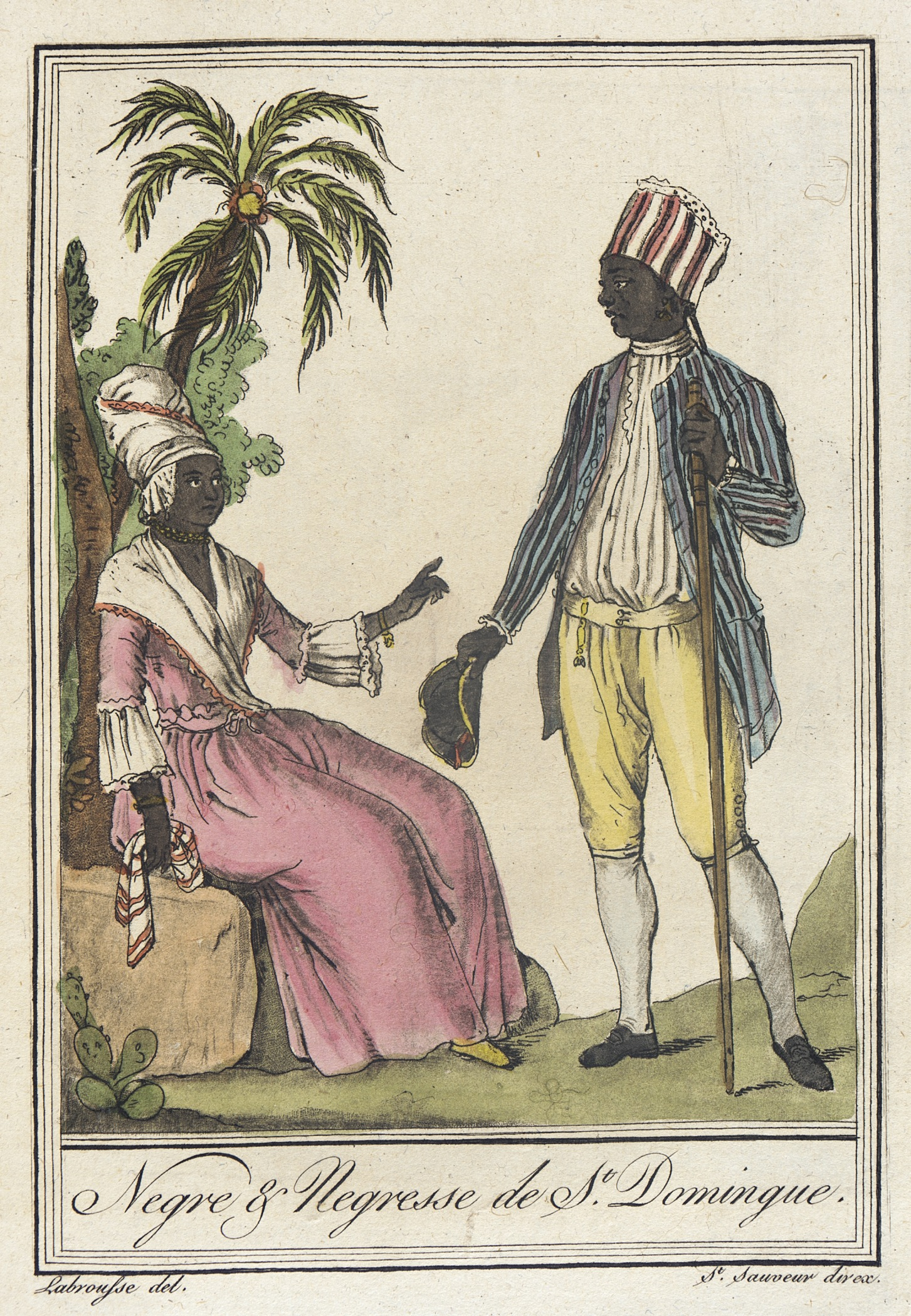
A rich Creole planter and his wife

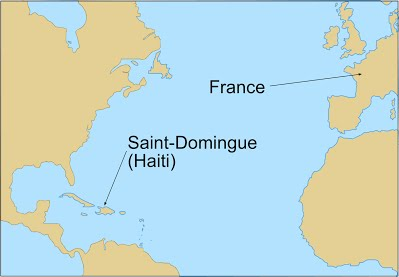
A picture depicting the distance between Saint-Domingue and France

Saint-Domingue had the largest and wealthiest free population of color in the Caribbean; they were known as the Gens de couleur libres (free people of color). Population estimations in 1789 indicate 28,000 to 32,000 affranchis and Creoles of color and 40,000 to 45,000 whites, which included its largest group being the Petits blancs (white commoners; lit: little whites) and Creoles of lighter complexions; French subjects: engagés (white indentured servants), foreign European immigrants or refugees, and a small exclusive group of Grands blancs (white nobles; lit: big whites) of whom the majority lived or were born in France, and the slave population totalled between 406,000 and 465,000. While many of the Gens de couleur libres were affranchis (ex-slaves), most members of this class were Creoles of color, i.e. free born blacks and mulattoes. As in New Orleans, a system of plaçage developed, in which white men had a kind of common-law marriage with slave or free mistresses, and provided for them with a dowry, sometimes freedom, and often education or apprenticeships for their children. Some such descendants of planters inherited considerable property.

While the French controlled Saint-Domingue, they maintained a class system which covered both whites and free people of color. These classes divided up roles on the island and established a hierarchy. The highest class, known as the grands blancs (white noblemen), was composed of rich nobles, including royalty, and mainly lived in France. These individuals held most of the power and controlled much of the property on Saint-Domingue. Although their group was very small and exclusive, they were quite powerful.

Below the grands blancs were the petits blancs (white commoners) and the gens de couleur libres (free people of color). These classes inhabited Saint Domingue and held a lot of local political power and control of the militia. Petits blancs shared the same societal level as gens de couleur libres.

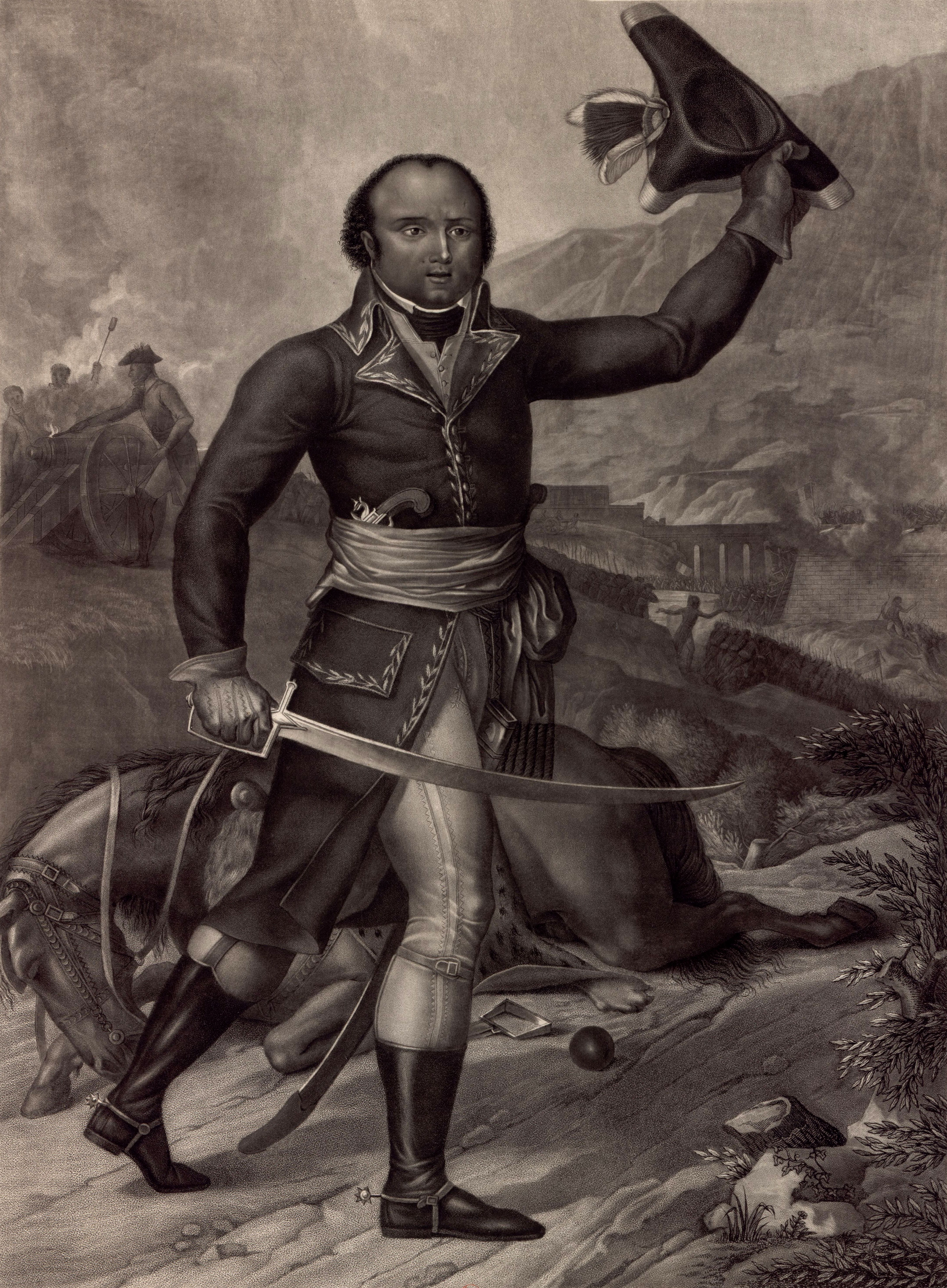
Thomas-Alexandre Dumas, a Creole general in the French Army.

The Gens de couleur libres class was made up of affranchis (ex-slaves), free-born blacks, and mixed-race people, and they controlled much wealth and land in the same way as petits blancs; they held full citizenship and civil equality with other French subjects. Race was initially tied to culture and class, and some "white" Creoles had non-white ancestry.

"These men are beginning to fill the colony... their numbers continually increasing amongst the whites, with fortunes often greater than those of the whites... Their strict frugality prompting them to place their profits in the bank every year, they accumulate huge capital sums and become arrogant because they are rich, and their arrogance increases in proportion to their wealth. They bid on properties that are for sale in every district and cause their prices to reach such astronomical heights that the whites who have not so much wealth are unable to buy, or else ruin themselves if they do persist. In this manner, in many districts the best land is owned by Creoles of color."

Although the Creoles of color and affranchis held considerable power, they eventually became the subject of racism and a system of segregation due to the introduction of divisionist policies by the royal government, as the Bourbon regime feared the united power of the Creoles.

Starting in the early 1760s, and gaining much impetus after 1769, Bourbon royalist authorities began attempts to cut Creoles of color out of Saint-Domingue's society, banning them from working in positions of public trust or as respected professionals. They were made subject to discriminatory colonial legislation. Statutes forbade Gens de couleur from taking up certain professions, wearing European clothing, carrying swords or firearms in public, or attending social functions where whites were present.

The regulations did not restrict their purchase of land, and many had already accumulated substantial holdings and became slave-owners. By 1789, they owned one-third of the plantation property and one-quarter of the slaves of Saint-Domingue. Central to the rise of the Gens de couleur planter class was the growing importance of coffee, which thrived on the marginal hillside plots to which they were often relegated. The largest concentration of Gens de couleur was in the southern peninsula. This was the last region of the colony to be settled, owing to its distance from Atlantic shipping lanes and its formidable terrain, with the highest mountain range in the Caribbean. In the parish of Jérémie, the gens de couleur libres formed the majority of the population. Many lived in Port-au-Prince as well, which became an economic center in the South of the island.

==== Africans in Saint-Domingue ====
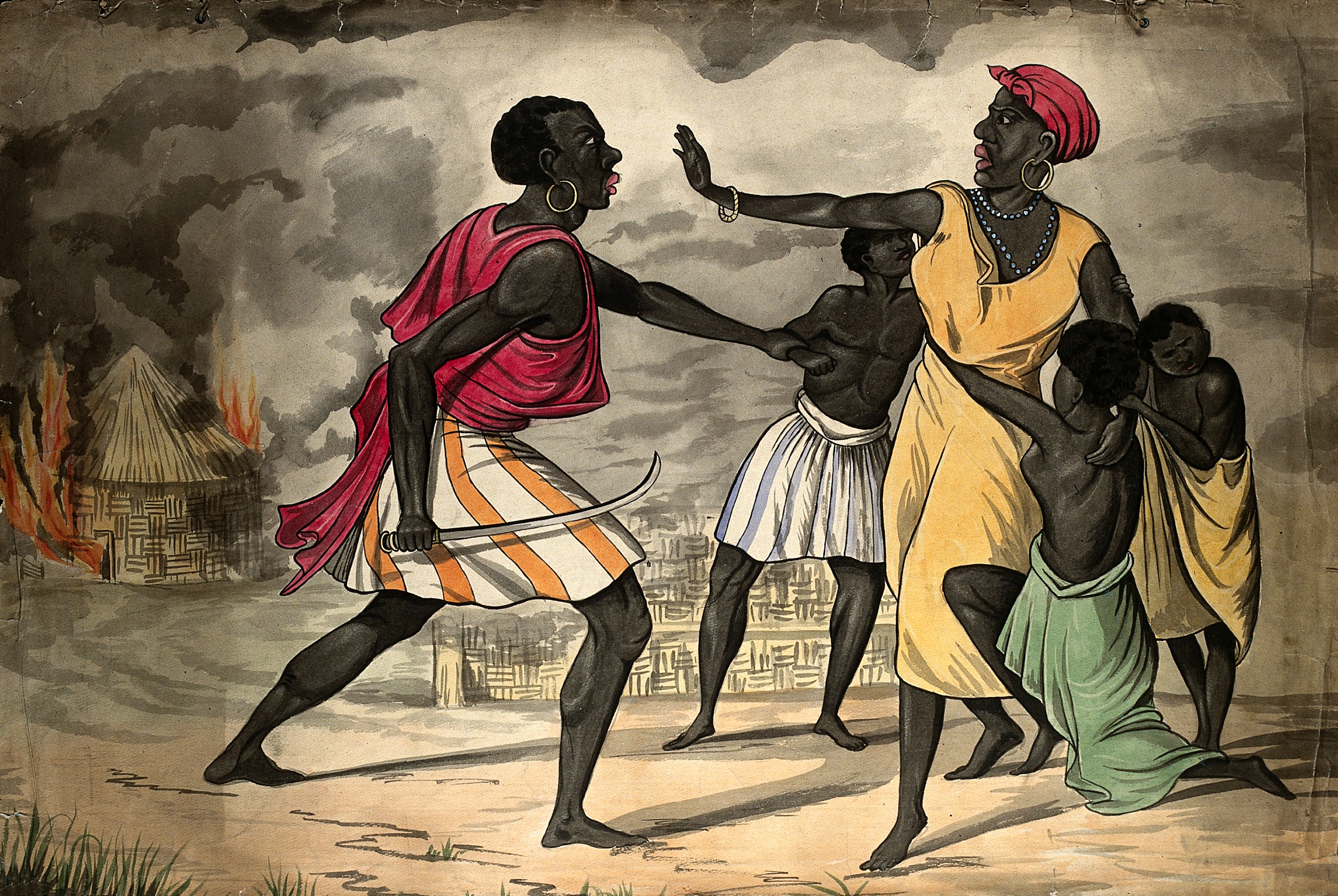
An African slaver capturing slaves for sale

The vast majority of the slaves in Saint-Domingue were war-captives who had lost a war with another ethnic group. Most slaves came from ethnic tension between different tribes and kingdoms, or religious wars between pagans and Muslim-pagan interreligious wars. Many of the slaves who came to Saint-Domingue could not return to Africa, as their home was controlled by an opposing African ethnic group, and they stayed as affranchis in Saint-Domingue.

R. Hé! hé! mô n'a pas pense ça, moi, qui mô va faire dans mo paye? mô n'a pas saclave?

Q. Ah! bin; quand vous arrive dans vous paye, vous n'a pas libe donc?

R. Non va; mô saclave la guerre; quand mô arrive là; zotte prend moi encore pour vendé moi. Quand mô fini mort, mô va allé dans mon paye, à v'là tout.

R. Hey! Hey! I don't think so, what am I going to do in my country? I won't be a slave?

Q. Ah! well; when you arrive in your country, you won't be free then?

R. Not at all; I'm a slave of war; when I arrive there, they will take me again and sell me. When I die, I will go to my country, that's all.

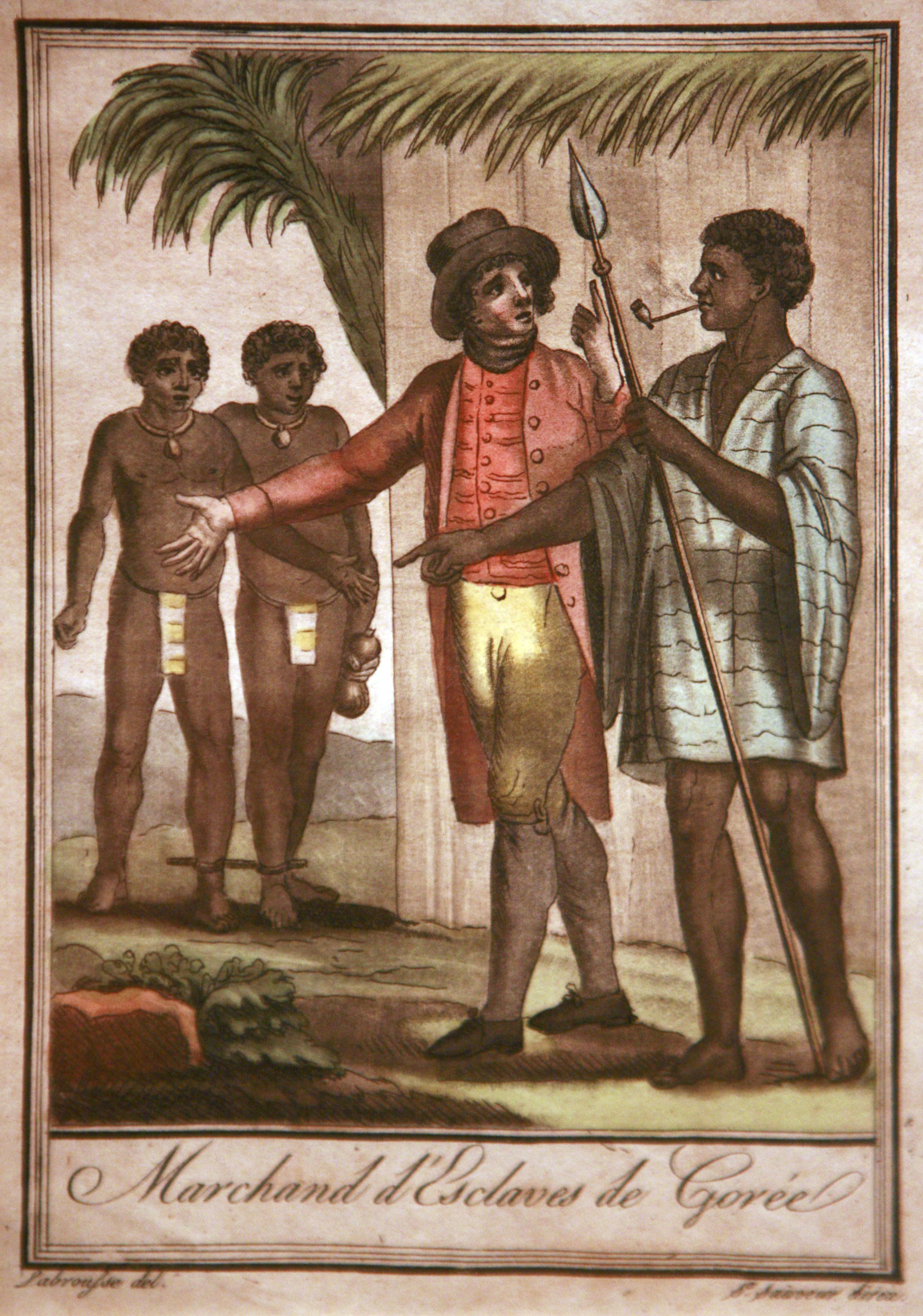
An African slave trader sells two slaves to a European

African folklore, such as the widespread tales of Compère Lapin and Compère Bouqui, has been recorded throughout Haiti.

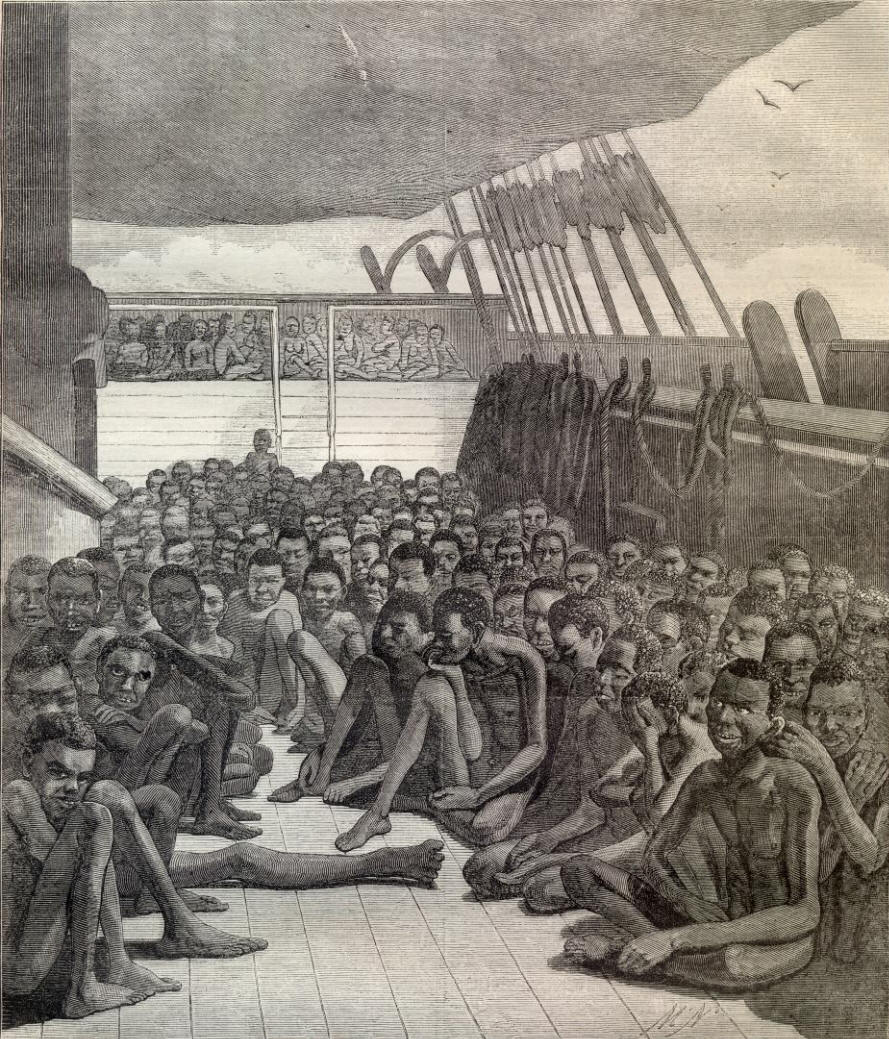
Slaves on a slave ship

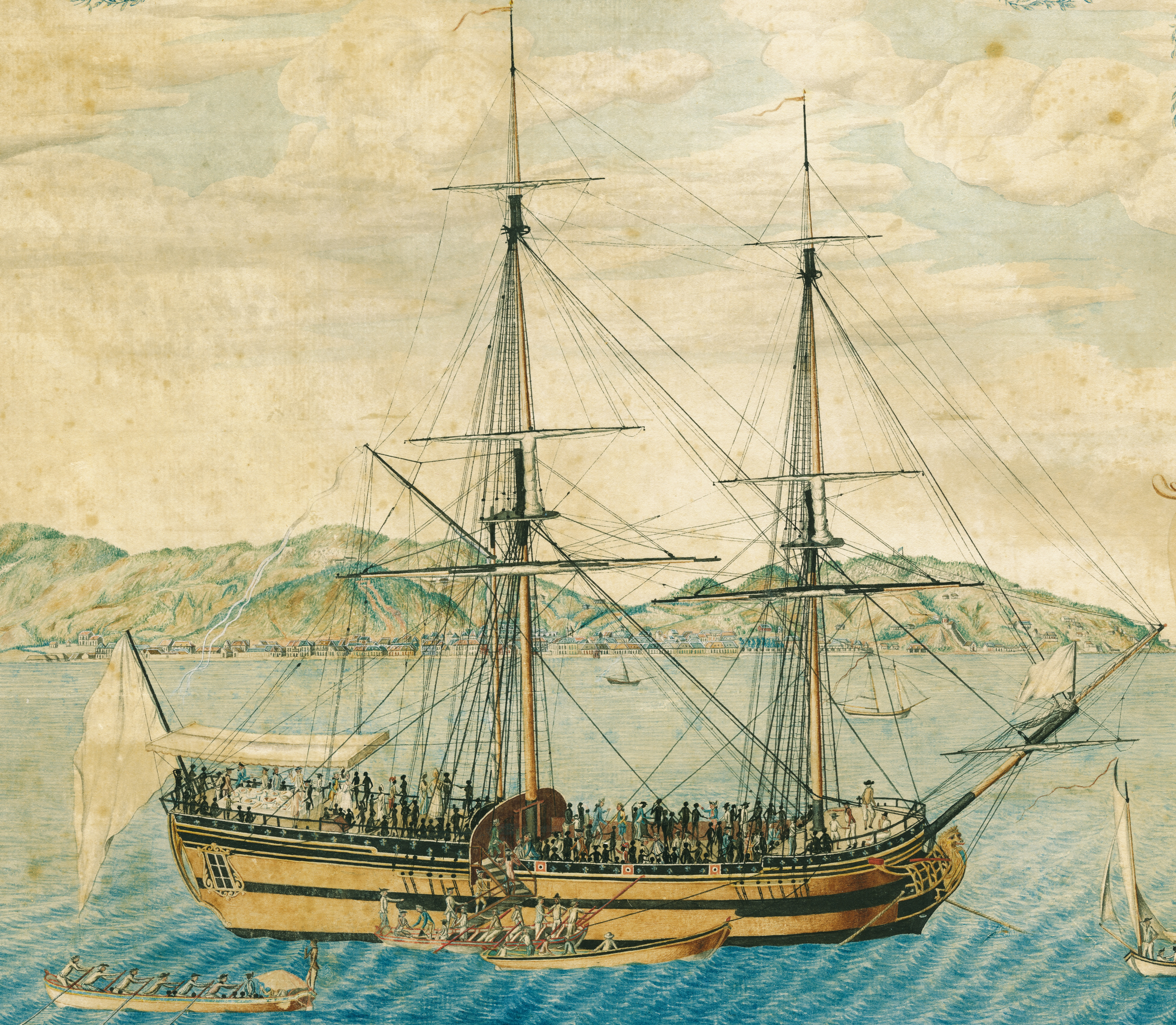
A slave ship arriving at Cap-Français, Saint-Domingue

Charles Malenfant, a French Captain of Dragoons who arrived in St. Domingue in 1792, after fighting had begun, compiled a list of who he thought were the different African peoples found in that French colony. Thus, the following list, taken from his 1814 Memoir, should be read as representative of European bias and second-hand knowledge:

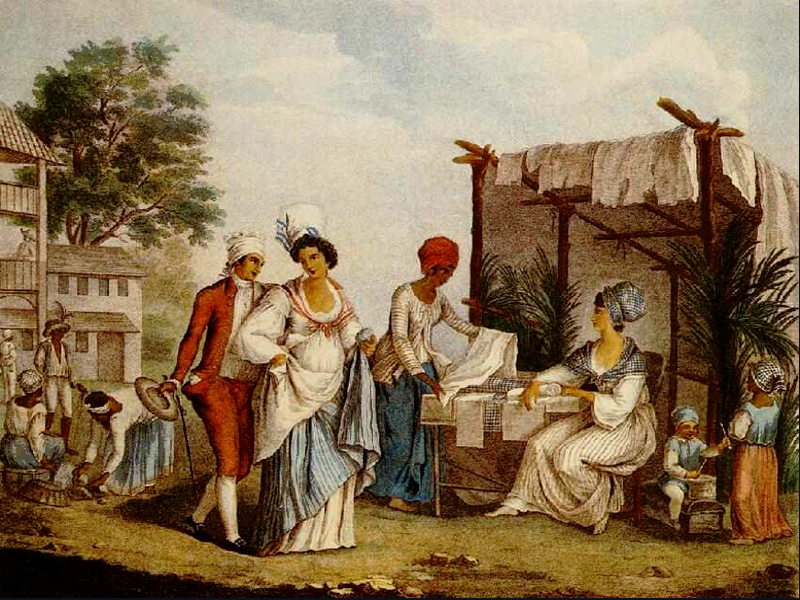
Dominican Creoles

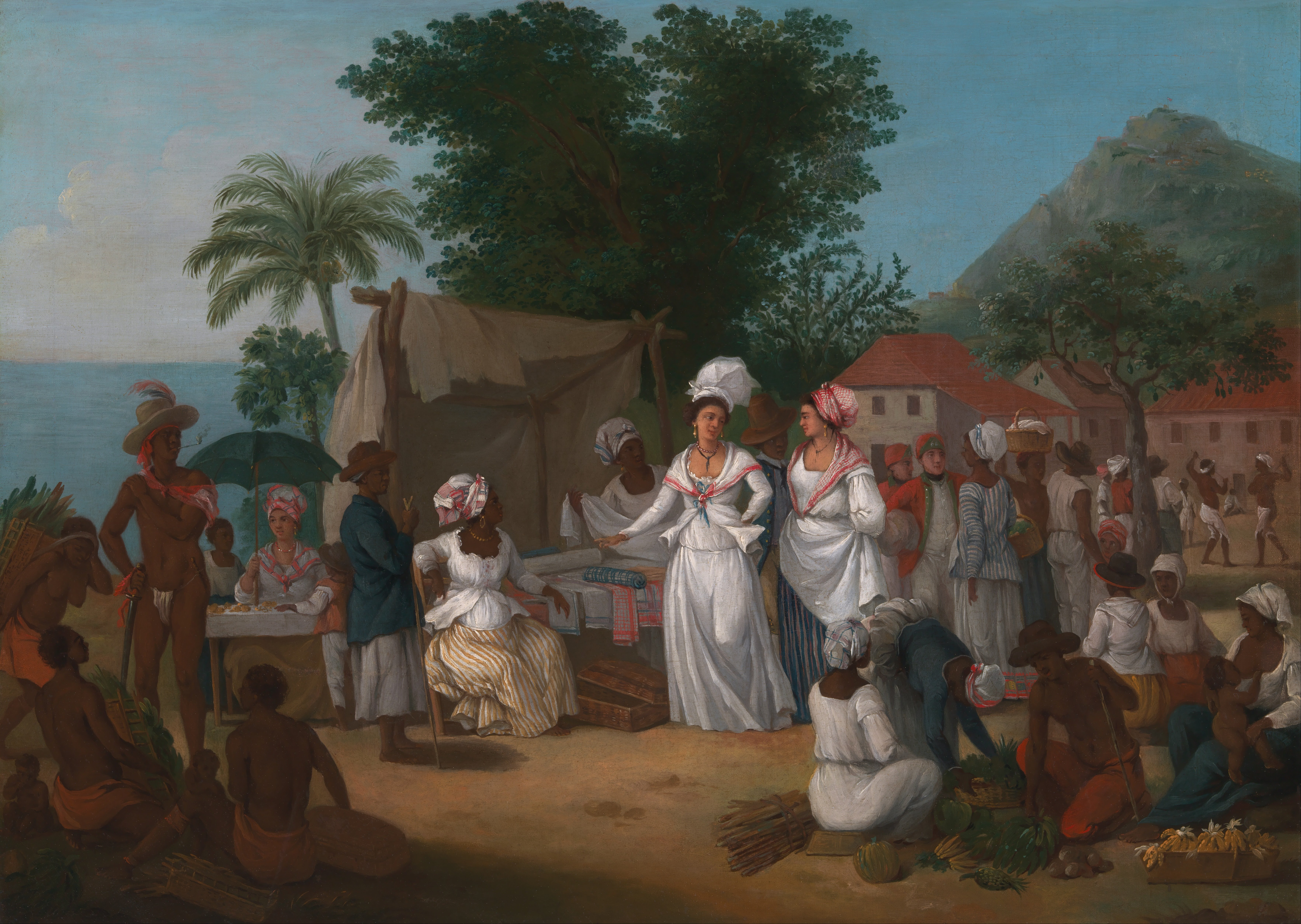
A Creole linen market

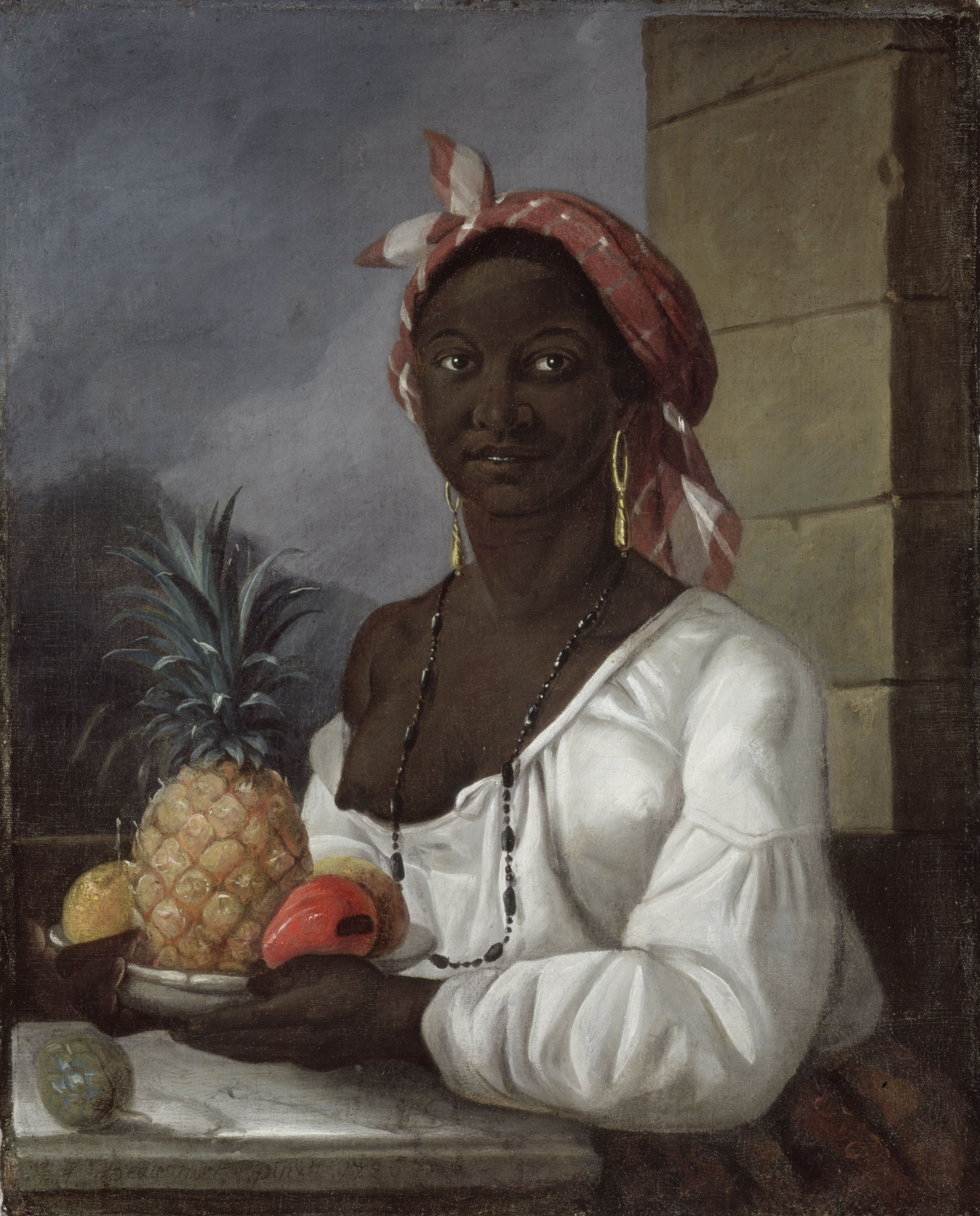
Portrait of a Haitian slave woman

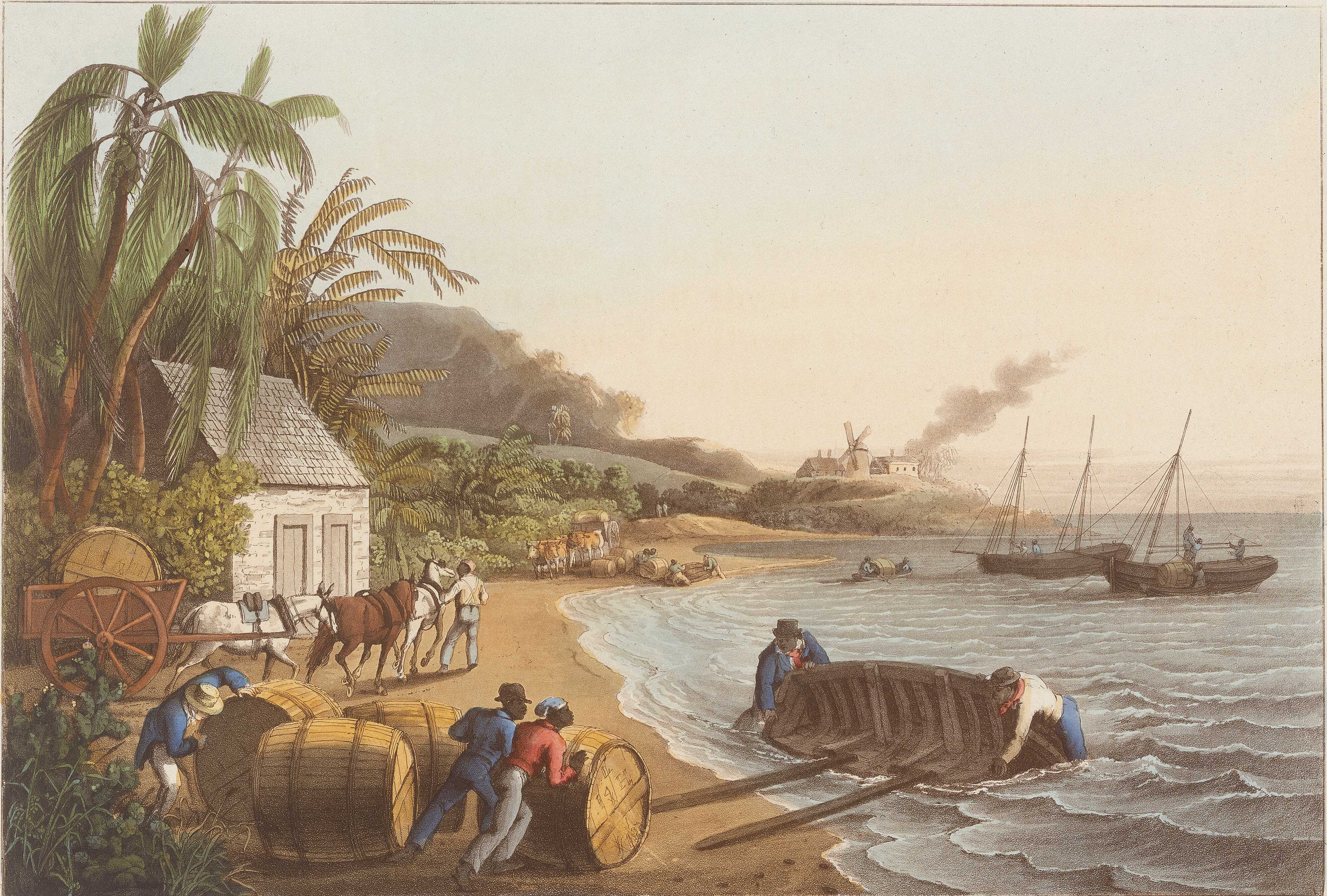
Sugar shipping out

- The Bambaras. Bambara was often used as a generic term for African slaves. European traders used Bambara as a term for defining vaguely a region of ethnic origin. Muslim traders and interpreters often used Bambara to indicate Non-Muslim captives. Slave traders would sometimes identify their slaves as Bambara in hopes of securing a higher price, as Bambara slaves were sometimes characterized as being more passive. Further confusing the name's indication of ethnic, linguistic, religious, or other implications, the concurrent Bambara Empire had notoriety for its practice of slave-capturing wherein Bambara soldiers would raid neighbors and capture the young men of other ethnic groups, forcibly assimilate them, and turn them into slave soldiers known as Ton. The Bambara Empire depended on war-captives to replenish and increase its numbers; many of the people who called themselves Bambara were indeed not ethnic Bambara.
- The Dunkos, a tattooed people whose women cherished their men with the utmost respect.
- The Aradas, a tattooed people who used poison to kill their enemies. They worshipped the moon, mollusks, and serpents. Toussaint Louverture was reportedly of Arada heritage.
- The people of Juida, a tattooed people whose women were known to be extroardinarily flirtatious. The women of Juida wore a heavy ring inside of their bottom lip, and the skin of their throat was modified with cuts of a knife.
- The people of Essa who religiously worshipped the dead king of their people as a divinity. They place his body in a pagoda following the main route of their capital on a richly ornamented throne, and worship him until the reigning King of Essa dies. The cadaver is embalmed with palm oil which conserves the body's freshness for a long time. The body is dressed very extravagantly, and a guardian watches it day and night as travelers come to visit and pay respects.
- The people of Urba, a fierce people who are arbitrary in their resolutions of revenge. If a murder takes place, the dead's relatives do not search for the killer; rather, they will hide and will disembowel the first passer-by without fear of a judiciary backlash, offering the victim's life as a sacrifice to their god Brataoth. They prepare the funeral of their relative, leaving the corpse of their victim exposed to the air, and devoured by ferocious beasts. They dig a huge trench where the murder was committed, so that the spirit of the dead may not wander to other places. The cadaver is embalmed and exposed and placed in an iron cage, so that the body is not touching the ground. For this reason the body is safe from carnivorous animals as they cannot get through the iron bars and the deepness of the trench. A little hut is constructed above the cage so that the weather does not interfere with the body.

The King of Urba often calls meetings of magic men that are called Makendals, whose purpose is to foresee the results of battles, and in the event of a defeat, to indicate which soldiers were responsible for the failure of the battle; the Makendals many times would arbitrarily call upon innocent men to face punishment for "criminal conduct" leading to the defeat. When the King of Urba loses many of his people to war, he assembles the Makendal council, and consults the members on the way to repopulate his kingdom, where he is recommended to buy 1. one hundred gourde vases, 2. one hundred jugs, 3. one hundred slaves. The Makendals transport all of these on the major roadway, and order the slaves' bodies to be opened, where they pour red palm oil inside and specific shells, and bury all of these items at a specific location. This is the ritual of repopulation to gain favor from their gods.
The Aminas who believed in metempsychosis, or the migration of the soul after death. When slaves from this ethnic group would arrive in Saint-Domingue, some would use suicide to return to the country of whence they came, believing that they would regain the rank, wealth, relatives, and friends that they lost after they were defeated in war.
For an example, an account of this metempsychosis occurred on the plantation of Mr.Desdunes, who had purchased an Amina woman and her two children. The woman and children had barely arrived on the island, and the woman was witnessed observing the Ester river, stopping every moment to measure the depth of the river, and making sighs while lifting her eyes to the sky.
One morning, the Amina woman was found drowned with her two children attached on her belt. The children's screams for help, echoing the horrors of their soon-to-be death, were heard by African fishermen, but not knowing to what to attribute the cause, they didn't go to the location to render aid.

- The Igbos who also believed in metempsychosis.
- The people of Borno had women who took very great care in selecting a suitable partner. The Borno women were absolutely submissive to their men, and sought to be bodily clean at all times. They would bathe three times a day and use palm oil to anoint their bodies.

In finding a partner, old women of Borno are chosen to examine the new wife, and they bring her to her nuptial bed playing instruments and singing chants of joy, if she is indeed found to be a virgin.

If, however, she is found not to be a virgin, she will be declared a prostitute. Prostitution in Borno was punished by enslavement; Borno prostitutes would be taken by order of the king, shipped to a coastal slave port to be sold to the first European slave ship that arrived.

During child birth, other Borno wise-women serve as nurses to provide aid to the soon-to-be mother. As the child is born and the umbilical cord is cut, the scissors used are placed carefully under the pillow of the baby. The scissors are not used again except for the purpose of cutting the umbilical cord.

New-born babies of Borno are tattooed eight days after their birth with the characteristics of their nation, which are placed on the face, the chest, on the arm, and elsewhere on the body. The designs are of a symmetrical sun, tongues of fire, diverse animals, of reptiles, and of prevalent architecture in their society.

The people of Borno do not eat meat unless it is sacrificed and blessed by their grand-priest, called an alpha. Pork is entirely banned from their diet.

A pilgrim to Borno will follow the main road with jugs filled with water, of which he offers to passer-byes or weary travelers.

Their common money is shells, and they have a great veneration for a prayer book that, if they touch it cannot leave before reading it, singing by memory. The people of Borno would rather sell all of their animals rather than diminish their piety for their sacred laws.

The Borno people have a code of laws for the punishment of crimes, following which require three witnesses to prosecute. Their good faith is so strong that if they are inclined to believe the witnesses, the accused will immediately be hung.

Every house in Borno is like small island surrounding a courtyard. At night, the whole family assembles in the home to avoid savage beasts like leopards & lions.

The King of Borno never leaves his palace, and if someone who enters into the palace dares to fix his eyes on him, he will be punished by death. While the king must make judgements in criminal proceedings, he is seated on a throne and hidden from the vision of the general population by a elegantly fashioned curtain. Any declaration he makes is echoed through the chamber by 7 pipes. The subject to whom the declaration is made indicates his submission to the judgement of the king by giving him his humble recognition, and he kneels, claps with his hands, and covers his head with ashes.

Thievery is abhorred in the society of Borno. If one is found guilty of thievery, the crime is not thought to be individual; indeed the whole family is charged with the crime. For example, if child of Borno takes something that doesn't belong to him, the courtiers of the king take the child and his whole family and sell them as slaves.

If a member of the royal court is found of adultery, he is punished with death. The woman will be drowned and the father and child are impaled and placed on the road to serve as an example.

The people of Borno can hunt once a year. They burn the grass in swamps to fetch the nests of aquatic fowl and take their eggs, and the turtles that hide in the area. As the people don't eat any meat except smoked, these provisions last for the whole year.

- The Mozambique people.
- The Dahomeans.
- The Accrans.
- The Crepans.
- The Assianthees.
- The Popans.
- The Fulanis.
- The Gabonese.
- The Congos were well known for their enjoyment of life. They lived life happily at a sweet and slow pace, and they loved dancing and relaxation; they were known for their great singing.
- The Senegalese people were often considered to be the most beautiful of the different African ethnicities found in Saint-Domingue.
- The Tacuas.
- The Hausas.
- The Nago Yoruba people.

==== Slavery in Saint-Domingue ====
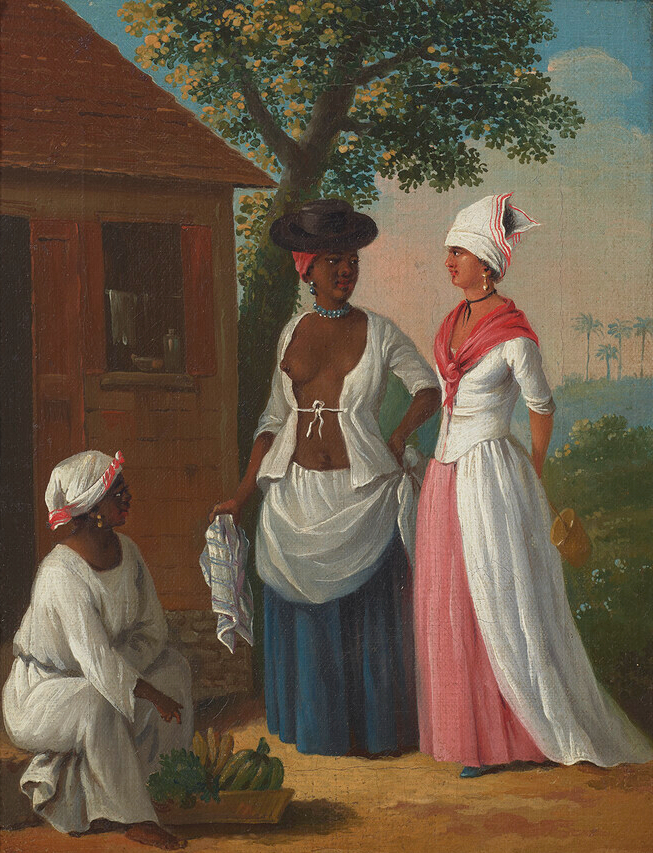
Creole ladies and a servant.

Most slaves who came to Saint-Domingue worked in fields or shops; younger slaves could become household servants, and old slaves were employed as surveillants. Some slaves became skilled workmen, and they received privileges such as better food, the ability to go into town, and liberté des savanes (savannah liberty), a sort of freedom with certain rules. Slaves were considered to be valuable property, and slaves were attended by doctors who gave medical care when they were sick.

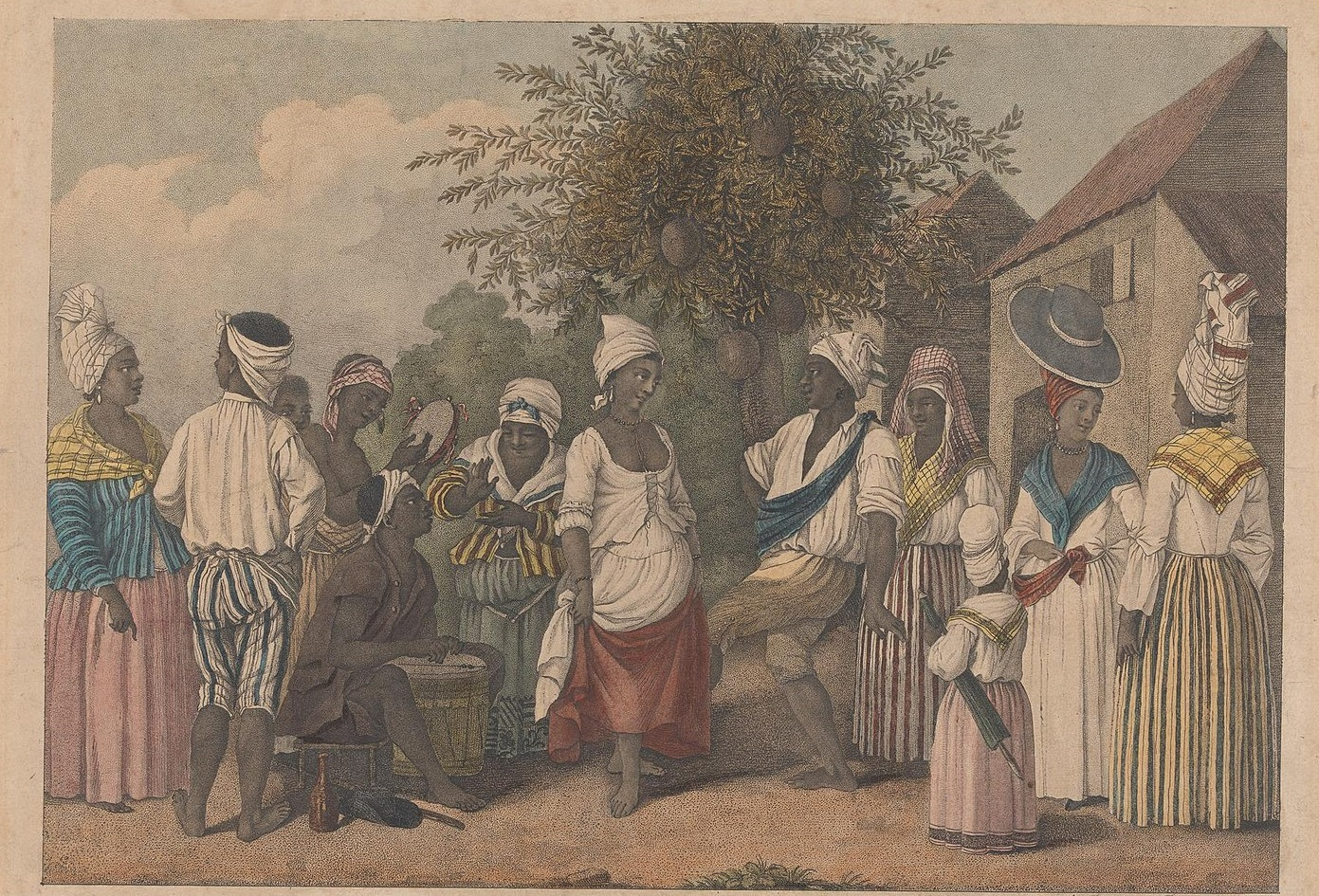
A Creole coffee plantation.

Here is a description of how the liberté des savanes (savannah liberty) Creole custom worked:

"My parent, like most Creoles, was an indulgent master, and more under the influence of his bondservants than he himself was aware of. A number of servants belonged to him, who either hired themselves in the capital or on estates, or became fishermen, chip-chip finders, or land-crab catchers. These people gave my father what they pleased out of their earnings; he scarcely took any account of what his slaves paid him: sufficient for him was it, that one part of them supplied him with enough to satisfy his immediate wants. The rest waited on him, or waited on each other, or, most properly speaking, waited for each other to work.

Thirteen adult slaves and three boys lived in his house: their united labour might have been performed by two or three paid domestics. Their time was chiefly spent in eating wangoo (boiled Indian cornflour), fish, land-crabs, and yams; sleeping; beating the African drum, composed of a barrel covered with a goat's skin; dancing, quarrelling, and love-making after their own peculiar amusement.

If a fine chicken-turtle, a large grouper, or delicious rock-hynd was caught by any of our fishermen, no price would tempt them to sell it; no, it must be sent or brought as a present to the master;... if my father received little money from his slaves, he wanted little, and fared sumptuously in consequence to the presents he received, and these were always given to him with pride."

To regularize slavery, in 1685 Louis XIV had enacted the Code Noir, which accorded certain rights to slaves and responsibilities to the master, who was obliged to feed, clothe and provide for the general well-being of his slaves.

The Code Noir also conferred affranchis (ex-slaves) full citizenship and gave complete civil equality with other French subjects. Saint Domingue's Code Noir never outlawed interracial marriage, nor did it limit the amount of property a free person could give to affranchis. Creoles of color and affranchis used the colonial courts to protect their property and sue whites in the colony.

The Code Noir sanctioned corporal punishment but had provisions intended to regulate the administration of punishments.

===== Sugar plantations =====
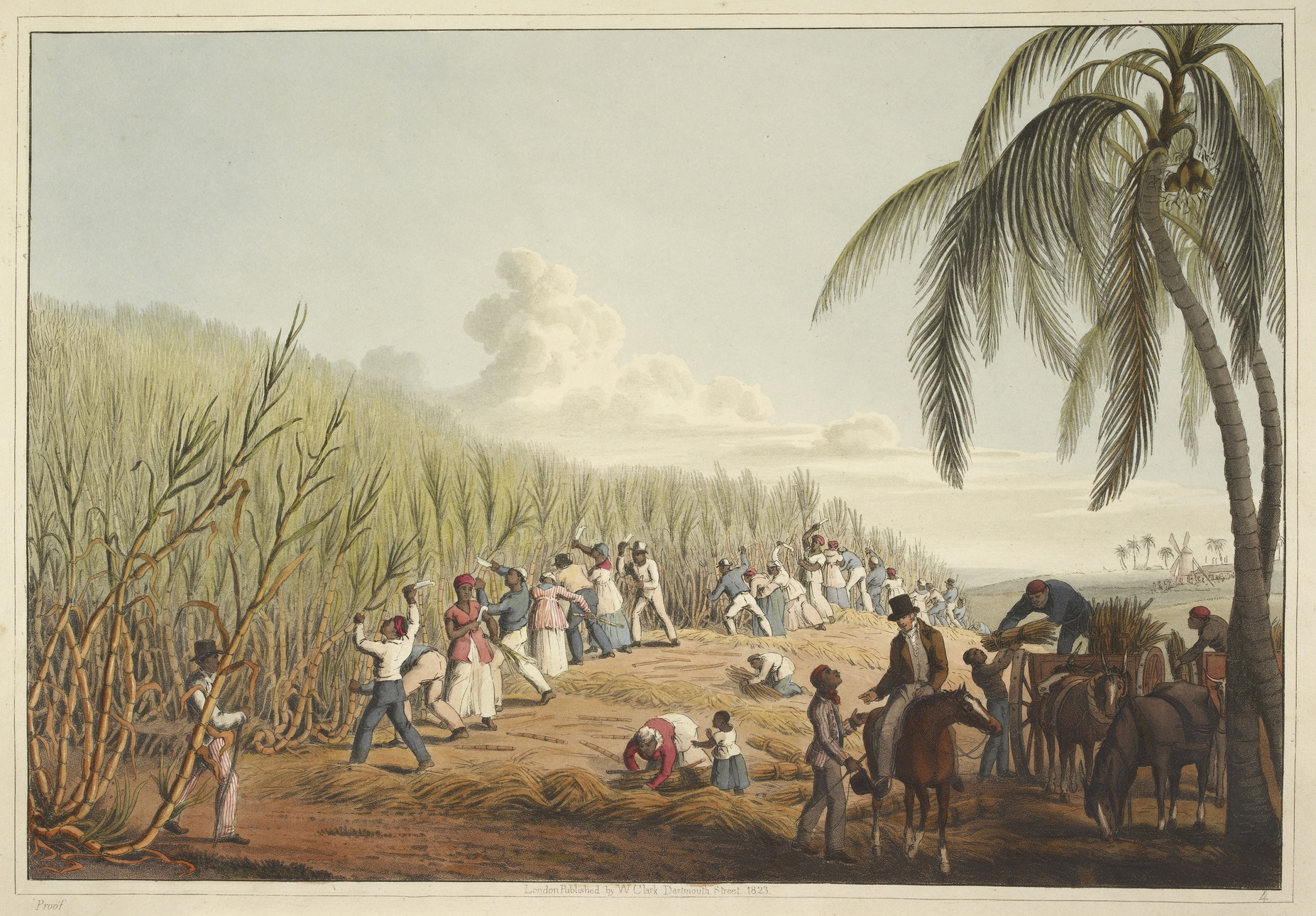
Slaves cutting a sugar cane field. A black commander speaks with a plantation steward.

Some sugar planters, bent on earning high sugar yields, worked their slaves very hard. Costs to start a sugar cane plantation were very high, compared to every other plantation type, often causing the proprietor of the sugar plantation to go into deep debt. Despite a rural police, due to Saint-Domingue's rough terrain and isolation away from French administration, the Code Noir's protections were sometimes ignored on remote sugar plantations. Justin Girod-Chantrans, a famous contemporary French traveler and naturalist of the time noted one such sugar plantation:

"The slaves numbered roughly one hundred men and women of different ages, all engaged in digging ditches in a cane field, most of them naked or dressed in rags. The sun beat down on their heads; sweat ran from all parts of their bodies. Their arms and legs, worn out by excessive heat, by the weight of their picks and by the resistance of the clayey soil become so hardened that it broke their tools, the slaves nevertheless made tremendous efforts to overcome all obstacles. A dead silence reigned among them. In their faces, one could see the human suffering and pain they endured, but the time for rest had not yet come. The merciless eye of the plantation steward watched over the workers while several black commanders, dispersed among the workers and armed with long whips, delivered harsh blows to those who seemed too weary to sustain the pace and were forced to slow down. Men, women, young and old alike – none escaped the crack of the whip if they could not keep up pace."

Work in the fields was often difficult, and life expectancy was low. Some owners deep in debt concluded that it was more economically profitable to work their slaves to death and import replacements than to provide their slaves with adequate food, clothing and medical care. Some 5–10 percent of slaves died every year, from disease and overworking, and even more when epidemics of disease swept through the colony. In fact, deaths were outpacing births. The population of the colony only remained constant due to the constant influx of enslaved people. A majority of slaves only lived for a few years after their arrival.

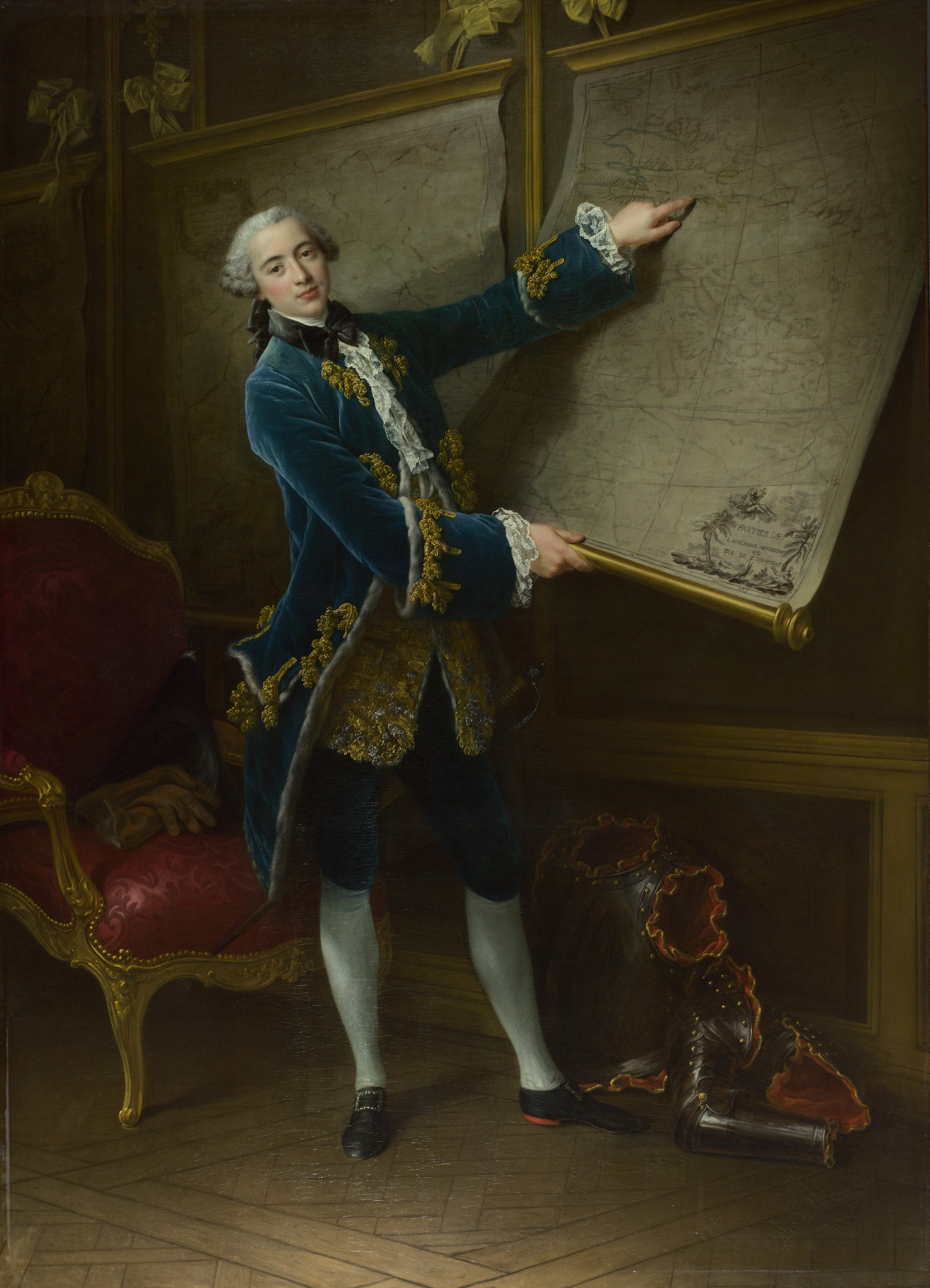
Portrait of the Comte de Vaudreuil by François-Hubert Drouais, 1758. Vaudreuil, the son of the colony's French governor, points to Saint-Domingue on a map.

Many people in the colony were outraged by the death of many slaves and the brutality occurring. They proposed reforms that would help the population growth including allowing pregnant women and mothers more time off.

A large portion of the enslaved work force worked in harvesting and processing sugar. The conditions made harvesting much more difficult. Slaves were met with 'razor-sharp' stalks; insects and snakes were also hiding within the fields. Work days during harvest typically lasted from 5 am to sunset. Stronger slaves would do difficult field work, while children and older slaves would do easier tasks, such as trimming canes. It is worth noting, however, that the processing of cane sugar was mostly completed by women. The processing of sugar in sugar mills was also dangerous, and it was not uncommon for slaves to lose arms.

African culture remained strong among slaves to the end of French rule. The folk religion of Vodou commingled Catholic liturgy and ritual with the beliefs and practices of the Vodun religion of Guinea, Congo and Dahomey. Creoles were hesitant to consider Vodou an authentic religion, perceiving it instead as superstition, and they promulgated laws against Vodou practices, effectively forcing it underground. Their connection with the Vodou religion aided in healing the trauma of plantation life, as they created their own rituals and healing processes. This outlet allowed the slaves in Saint-Domingue to escape the society that saw them as property and not human.

==== Marronnage ====
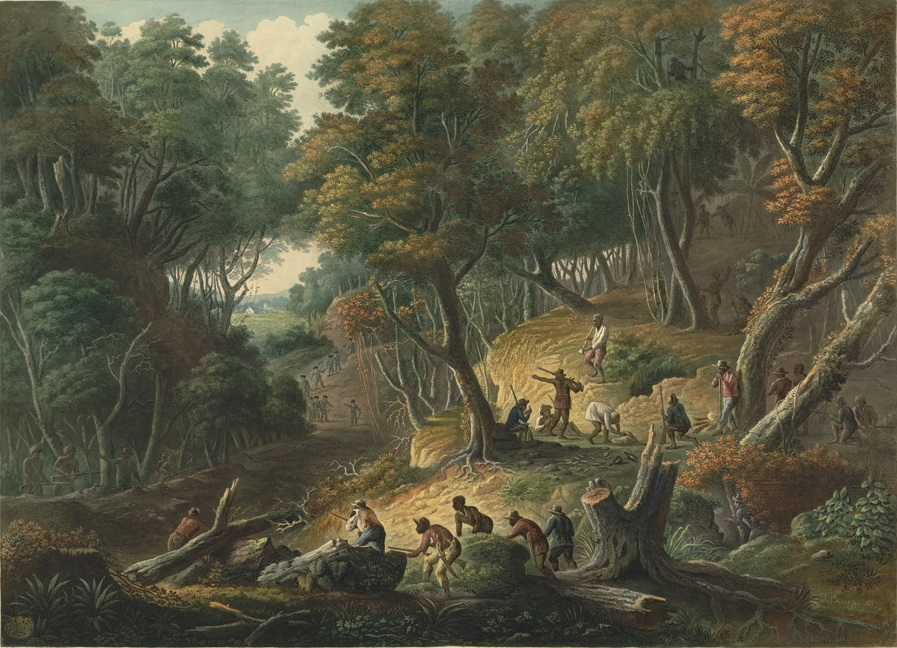
Maroons preparing to ambush a convoy

Thousands of slaves escaped into the mountains of Saint-Domingue, forming communities of maroons and raiding isolated plantations. The most famous was Mackandal, a one-armed slave, originally from the Guinea region of Africa, who escaped in 1751. A Vodou Houngan (priest), he united many of the different maroon bands. For the next six years, he staged successful raids while evading capture by the French. He and his followers reputedly killed more than 6,000 people. He preached a radical vision of killing the white population of Saint-Domingue. In 1758, after a failed plot to poison the drinking water of the planters, he was captured and burned alive at the public square in Cap-Français.

"The Minister should be informed that there are inaccessible or reputedly inaccesible areas in different sections of our colony which serve as retreat and shelter for maroons; it is in the mountains and in the forests that these tribes of slaves establish themselves and multiply, invading the plains from time to time, spreading alarm and always causing great damage to the inhabitants."

Slaves who fled to remote mountainous areas were called marron (French) or mawon (Haitian Creole), meaning 'escaped slave'. The maroons formed close-knit communities that practised small-scale agriculture and hunting. They were known to return to plantations to free family members and friends. On a few occasions, they also joined the Indigenous settlements, who had escaped the Spanish in the 17th century. In the late 17th and early 18th centuries, there were a large number of maroons living in the Bahoruco mountains. In 1702, a French expedition against them killed three maroons and captured 11, but over 30 evaded capture, and retreated further into the mountainous forests. Further expeditions were carried out against them with limited success, though they did succeed in capturing one of their leaders, Michel, in 1719. In subsequent expeditions, in 1728 and 1733, French forces captured 46 and 32 maroons respectively. No matter how many detachments were sent against these maroons, they continued to attract runaways. Expeditions in 1740, 1742, 1746, 1757 and 1761 had minor successes against these maroons, but failed to destroy their hideaways.

"They gather together in the woods and live there exempt from service to their masters without any other leader but one elected among them; others, under cover of the cane fields by day, wait at night to rob those who travel along the main roads, and go from plantation to plantation to steal farm animals to feed themselves, hiding in the living quarters of their friends who, ordinarily, participate in their thefts and who, aware of the goings on in the master's house, advise the fugitives so that they can take the necessary precautions to steal without getting caught."

In 1776–77, a joint French-Spanish expedition ventured into the border regions of the Bahoruco mountains, with the intention of destroying the maroon settlements there. However, the maroons had been alerted of their coming, and had abandoned their villages and caves, retreating further into the mountainous forests where they could not be found. The detachment eventually returned, unsuccessful, and having lost many soldiers to illness and desertion. In the years that followed, the maroons attacked a number of settlements, including Fond-Parisien, for food, weapons, gunpowder and women. It was on one of these excursions that one of the maroon leaders, Kebinda, who had been born in freedom in the mountains, was captured. He later died in captivity.

In 1782, de Saint-Larry decided to offer peace terms to one of the maroon leaders, Santiago, granted them freedom in return for which they would hunt all further runaways and return them to their owners. Eventually, at the end of 1785, terms were agreed, and the more than 100 maroons under Santiago's command stopped making incursions into French colonial territory.

==== White indentured servitude and economic downturn ====
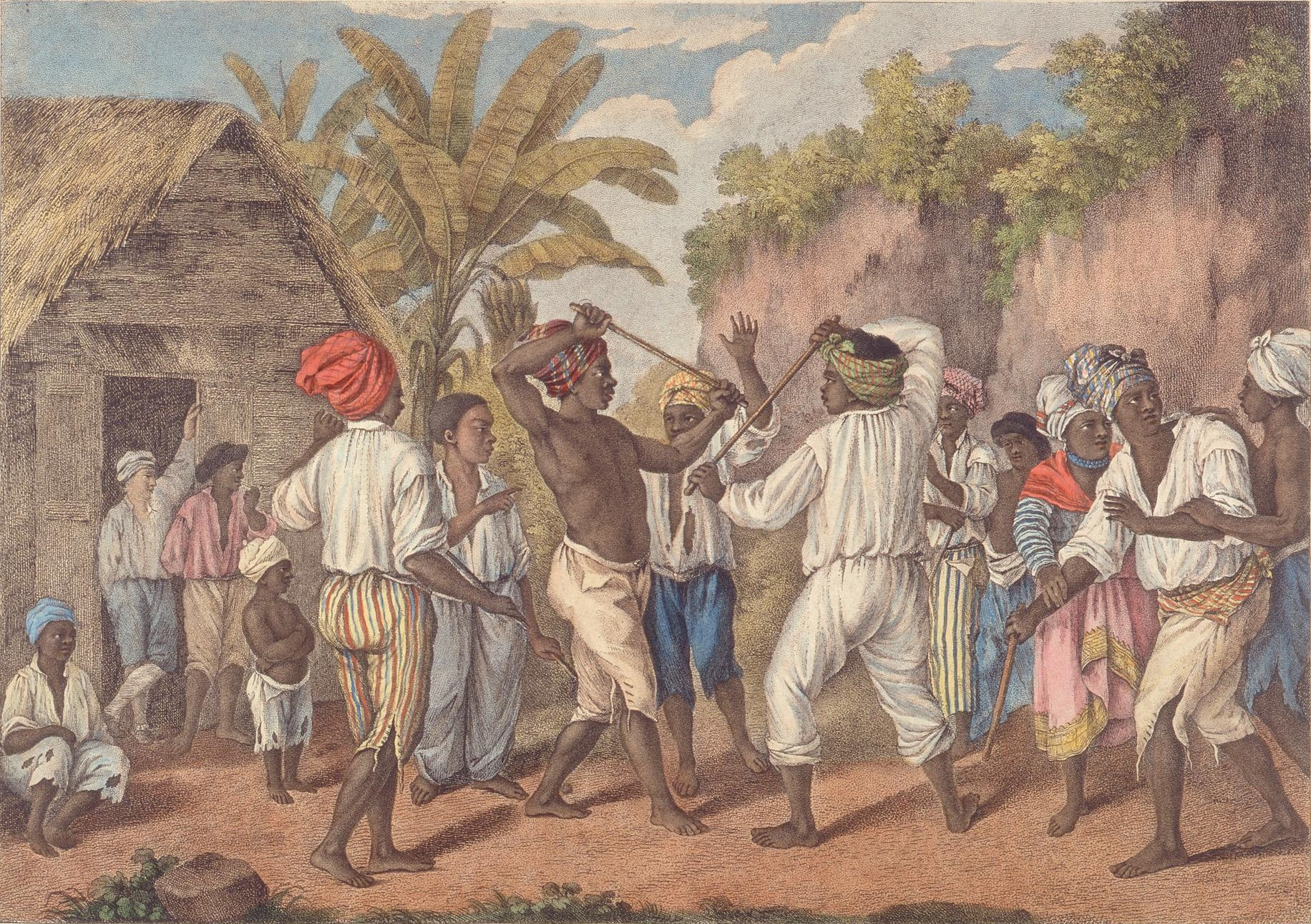
Slaves having a stick fight. A white engagé (indentured servant) is on the left.

As the social systems of Saint-Domingue began to erode after the 1760s, the plantation economy of Saint-Domingue also began to weaken. The price of slaves doubled between 1750 and 1780 and land in Saint-Domingue tripled in price during the same period. Sugar prices still increased, but at a much lower rate than before. The profitability of other crops like coffee collapsed in 1770, causing many planters to go into debt. The planters of Saint-Domingue were eclipsed in their profits by enterprising businessmen; they no longer had a guarantee on their plantation investment, and the slave-trading economy came under increased scrutiny.

Along with the establishment of a French abolitionist movement, the Société des amis des Noirs, French economists demonstrated that paid labor or indentured servitude were much more cost-effective than slave labor. In principle the widespread implementation of indentured servitude on plantations could have produced the same output as slave labor. However, the Bourbon King Louis XVI did not want to change the labor system in his colonies, as slave labor was directly responsible for allowing France to surpass Britain in trade.

Slaves, however, became expensive, each one costing around 300 Spanish dollars. To counteract expensive slave labor, white indentured servants were imported. White indentured servants usually worked for five to seven years and their masters provided them housing, food, and clothing. Saint-Domingue gradually increased its reliance on indentured servants (known as petits blanchets or engagés) and by 1789 about 6 percent of all white Creoles were employed as labor on plantations along with slaves.

Many of the indentured servants in Saint-Domingue were German settlers or Acadian refugees deported by the British from old Acadia during the French and Indian War. Hundreds of Acadian refugees perished while forceably building a jungle military base for the French government of Saint-Domingue.

Despite signs of economic decline, Saint-Domingue continued to produce more sugar than all of the British Caribbean islands combined.

=== End of colonial rule ===
==== The Rebellion of Saint-Domingue ====
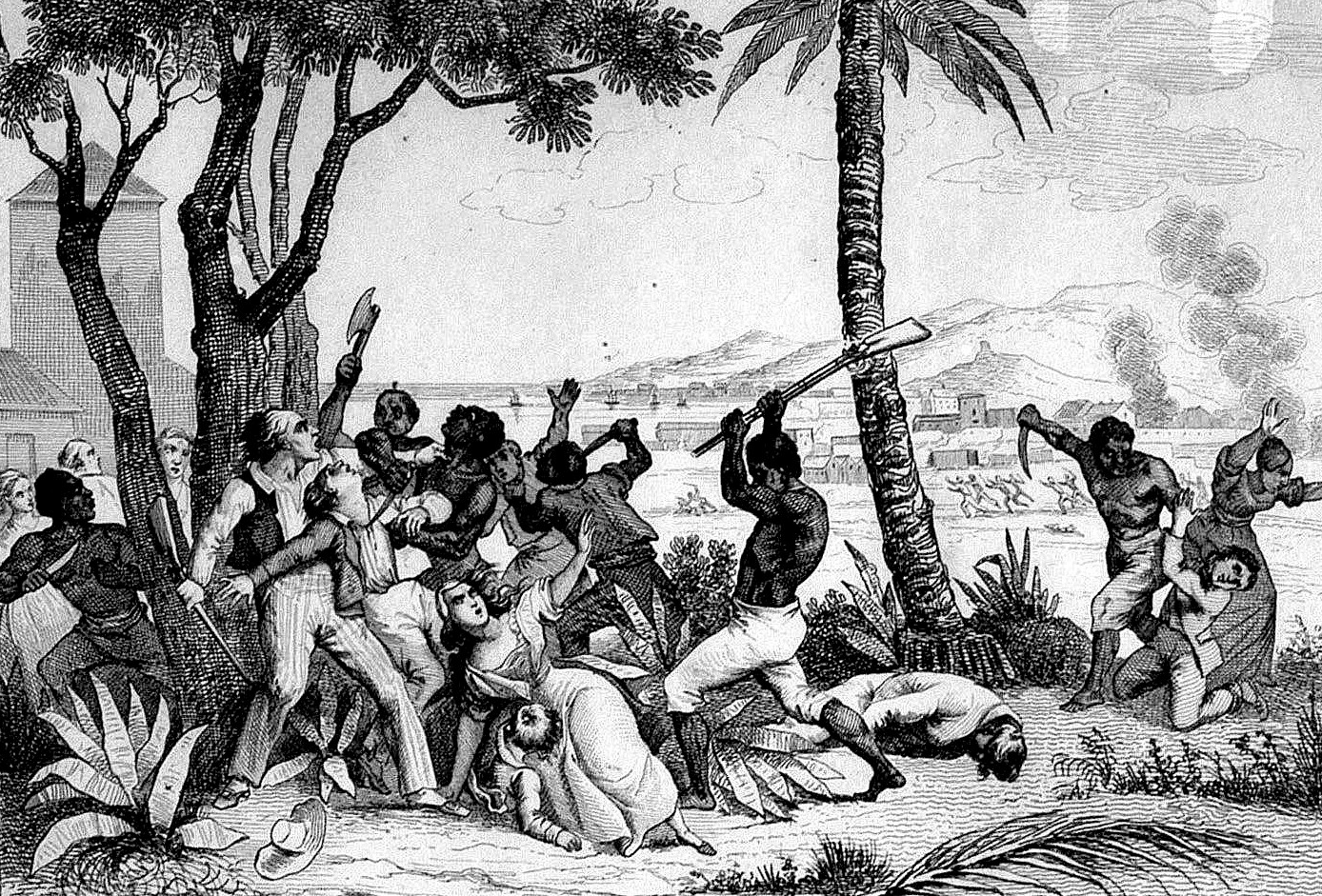
The Saint-Domingue slave revolt in 1791

Flag of the rebels (1791–1798)

Bourbon Royalist flag (1791–1814)

In France, the majority of the Estates General, an advisory body to the King, reconstituted itself as the Republican National Assembly, made radical changes in French laws, and on 26 August 1789, published the Declaration of the Rights of Man and of the Citizen, declaring all men free and equal. The French Revolution shaped the course of the conflict in Saint-Domingue and was at first widely welcomed on the island.

Wealthy Creole planters saw it as an opportunity to gain independence from France. The elite planters intended to take control of the island and create favorable trade regulations to further their own wealth and power and to restore social & political equality granted to the Creoles.

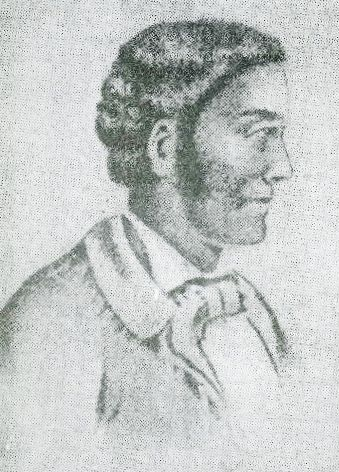
Creole rebel leader, Jean-Baptiste Chavannes

Creole aristocrats like Vincent Ogé, Jean-Baptiste Chavannes, and the ex-governor of Saint-Domingue Guillaume de Bellecombe, incited several revolts to take control of Saint-Domingue from the Royal government. These revolts included the incitation of a slave revolt that destroyed much of the northern plain of Saint-Domingue. Creole rebel forces eventually defeated the Bourbon royalists, but they soon lost control of the slave revolt as Spanish and British forces concurrently invaded the colony.

"The rebellion was extremely violent ... the rich plain of the North was reduced to ruins and ashes ..." Within two months, the slave revolt in northern Saint-Domingue killed 2,000 Creoles and burned 280 sugar plantations owned by grand blancs. Ash from blazing sugar cane fields fell from afar onto Cap-Français. As the rebellion in Saint-Domingue dragged on, it changed in nature from a political revolution to a racial war.

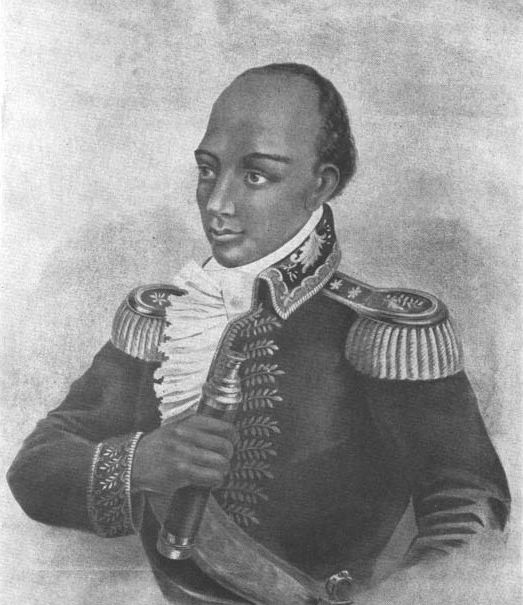
Toussaint L'Ouverture with Sonthonax

After months of arson and murder, Toussaint Louverture, a planter and Jacobin from Saint-Domingue, and his general Jean-Jacques Dessalines, a field slave, took charge of the leaderless slave revolt; they formed an alliance with Spanish invasion forces. Louverture and Dessalines were inspired by the houngans (sorcerers or priests of Haitian Vodou) Dutty Boukman and François Mackandal.

As 7,000 French Republican forces arrived on the island in September 1792, they began fighting against the Creole rebels, Bourbon Royalists, as well as British and Spanish forces. In an attempt to take control of the slave revolt and entice Creole rebels to join them, French Republicans declared amnesty for any revolting slaves and Creole rebels if they would fight for the Republic.

To gain amnesty, Louverture betrayed the Spanish forces, eradicated them, and joined the Republican revolutionary army.

===== Commissioner Sonthonax =====
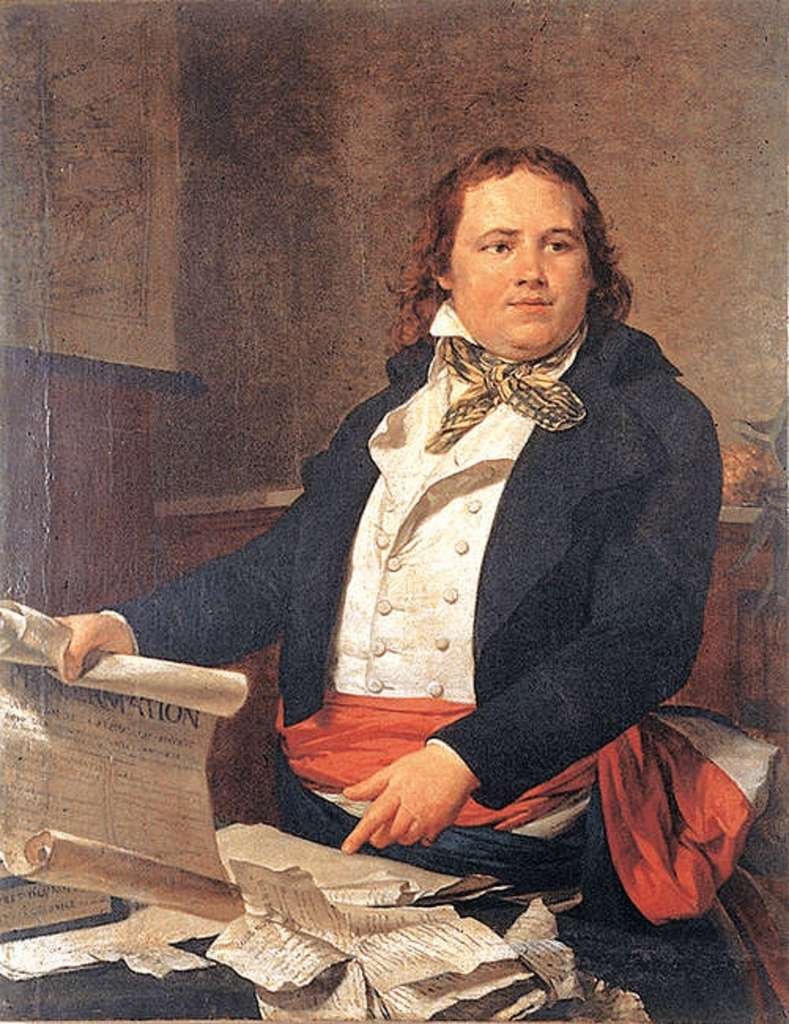
Republican abolitionist and Jacobin Léger-Félicité Sonthonax

Léger-Félicité Sonthonax from September 1792 to 1795 was the de facto ruler of Saint-Domingue. He was a French Girondist and abolitionist during the French Revolution, and closely associated with the Société des amis des Noirs (Friends of the Blacks Society). His official title was Civil Commissioner. Within a year of his appointment, his powers were considerably expanded by the Committee of Public Safety.

Sonthonax believed that all of Saint-Domingue's whites were Bourbon royalist or rebel separatist conservatives attached to independence or joining Spain. He stripped away all of the military power of white Creoles, and by doing so, he alienated them from the Republican government. Meaning to radicalize slaves to the Republican cause, Sonthonax wrote:

"A vla yo donc yon foi démasqué cila la yo toi hélé zamis pays cila-la, qui livré la ville du Cap dans difé et dans pillage, zamis de france la yo qui gagné pour cri ralliement Vive le Roi, qui hélé Pagnols sur terre à nous, qui grossi zarmée à yo, qui livré yo postes que nous té confié yo, qui osé faire complots pour prend pays-ci baye Pagnols... cila yo qui fait complot là, c'est presque toute Blanc qui té à St Domingue, cila yo qui té gagné dettes en pile, quoique yo té gagné l'air riche, cila yo qui té vlé pillage parceque yo té pas gagné à rien."

"C'est cila io qui plus grands ennemis z'autres qui excité impatience z'autres, qui faire z'autres croire io va tromper z'autres, qui conseillé z'autres faire z'attroupements, & qui cherché faire z'autres soulevé. C'est quelques mauvais blancs & quelques femmes du 4 avril qui gagné peur perdi z'autres, & qui conseillé z'autres brûler cases, faire pillage, tuyé monde & faire brigandages. Io croire, parce que io va retarder révolution la, io va empêcher li caba. Io sottes! io pas voir io mêmes ta payé toute crimes io conseillé z'autres faire. Z'autres sages passé io, z'autres mérité la liberté passé io, z'autres commencé remplir devoirs citoyens, z'autres respecté la loi, l'ordre public & toutes autorités constituées la io... République France qui connoit la liberté & l'égalité assez pas capable vlé z'autres rêté toujours dans l'esclavage."

"Look here, once and for all unmasked, it's them who you call friends in this country, who delivered Cap-Français to fire and pillaging, those friends of France who have the rallying cry "Long live the King!", who called the Spanish to our land, who grew their army, who delivered them the posts that we entrusted to them, who have the audacity to plot to take this country and give it to the Spanish... those who are plotting, it's almost all of the whites who are in St. Domingue, those who had a bunch of debts, who seemed rich, it's them who wanted all of the pillaging because they don't have anything."

"Those who are your biggest enemies, those who excited your impatience, who make you all believe that they'll fool you, who advised you to make regiments, and who sought to make you revolt. It's evil whites and women from April 4 who were afraid of losing you, and they advised you to burn homes, pillage, kill people and do banditry. They believe that, because these will delay the revolution, they will prevent it from finishing. They're idiots! They don't see that they will pay for all of the crimes they advised you all to make. You all are smarter than them, you deserve liberty more than them, you are beginning to fill the duties of citizens, you're respecting the law, public order and all of the constituted authorities... The French Republic who knows enough liberty and equality cannot allow you all to remain in slavery."

Many gens de couleur, the affranchis (ex-slaves) and Creole residents of the colony whose rights were restored by the French National Convention as part of the decree of 15 May 1792, asserted that they could form the military backbone of Republican Saint-Domingue; Sonthonax rejected this view as outdated in the wake of the August 1791 slave uprising. He believed that Saint-Domingue would need slave soldiers among the ranks of the colonial army if it was to survive. Sonthonax abolished slavery in Saint-Domingue with an emancipation proclamation; some of his critics allege that he ended slavery to maintain his own power.

Louverture worked together with Sonthonax for a few years, but he ultimately forced Sonthonax out of his position in 1795, and became the sole ruler of northern Saint-Domingue.

==== Civil War and invasion of Santo Domingo (1798–1801) ====
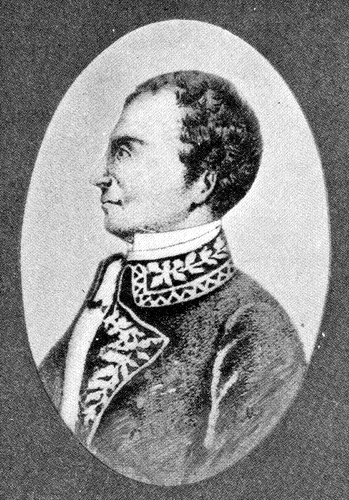
Creole general André Rigaud

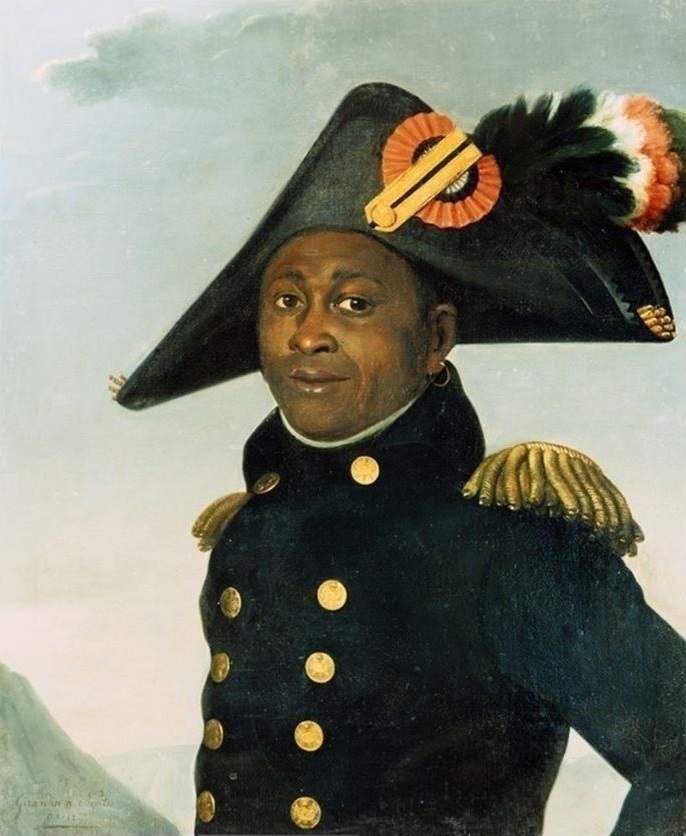
Governor-General-for-life of Saint-Domingue, Toussaint Louverture

In 1799, Louverture started a civil war known as the War of the South with Creole general André Rigaud who ruled an autonomous state in the south; Louverture claimed that Rigaud attempted to assassinate him. Louverture delegated most of the campaign to his lieutenant, Jean-Jacques Dessalines, who became infamous, during and after the civil war, for murdering about 10,000 Creole captives and civilians. After defeating Rigaud, Louverture became master of the whole French colony of Saint-Domingue.

Flag of Santo Domingo

Republican French flag

In November 1799, during the civil war in Saint-Domingue, Napoleon Bonaparte gained power in France. He created a new civil code; the French Civil Code of Napoleon affirmed the political and legal equality of all adult men; it established a merit-based society in which individuals advanced in education and employment because of talent rather than birth or social standing. The Civil Code confirmed many of the moderate revolutionary policies of the National Assembly but retracted measures passed by the more radical Convention.

Napoleon also passed a new constitution, declaring that the colonies would be subject to special laws. Although slaves in Saint-Domingue suspected this meant the re-introduction of slavery, Napoleon began by confirming Louverture's position and promising to maintain the abolition.

Napoleon forbade Louverture to control the formerly Spanish settlement on the eastern side of Hispaniola, as that would have given Louverture a more powerful defensive position. In January 1801, Louverture invaded the Spanish territory of Santo Domingo, taking possession of it from the governor, Don Garcia, with few difficulties. The area was less developed and populated than the French section. Louverture brought it under French law, abolishing slavery and embarking on a program of modernization. He now controlled the entire island.

Louverture promulgated the Constitution of 1801 on 7 July, officially establishing his authority as governor general "for life" over the entire island of Hispaniola and confirming most of his existing policies. Article 3 of the constitution states: "There cannot exist slaves [in Saint-Domingue], servitude is therein forever abolished. All men are born, live and die free and French."

During this time, Bonaparte met with the planters of Saint-Domingue and they urged the restoration of slavery in Saint-Domingue, stating that it was integral to the colony's economy.

===== Toussaint Louverture's prevention of economic collapse in Saint-Domingue =====
Louverture as Saint-Domingue's Governor-General-for-life enacted forced plantation labor to prevent the collapse of Saint-Domingue's economy. This may have contributed to a rebellion against his regime of forced labor led by his nephew and top general, Moïse, in October 1801. Louverture violently suppressed the labor rebellion, with the result that when the French ships arrived, not all of Saint-Domingue was automatically on Louverture's side.

A minority of state officials and civil servants were exempt from manual labor, including Creoles of color. Many of Saint-Domingue's poor had to work hard to survive, and they became increasingly motivated by their hunger. Consisting mostly of slaves, the population was uneducated and largely unskilled. They lived under Louverture's authoritarian control as forced rural laborers. Whites felt the sting of labor most sharply. While Louverture, an affranchi who had a tolerant master and became a slave holder and plantation owner himself, felt magnanimity toward whites, Dessalines, a former field slave, despised them.

Many of Saint-Domingue's whites fled the island during the civil war. Toussaint Louverture, however, understood that they formed a vital part of the economy in Saint-Dommingue as a middle class, and in the hopes of slowing the impending economic collapse, he invited them to return. He gave property settlements and indemnities for war time losses, and promised equal treatment in his new Saint-Domingue; a good number of white Creole refugees did return. The refugees who came back to Saint-Domingue and believed in Toussaint Louverture's rule were later exterminated by Jean-Jacques Dessalines.

==== The Haitian Revolution ====
Haitian Revolutionary flag (1803)

Napoleon dispatched troops in 1802 under the command of his brother-in-law, General Charles Emmanuel Leclerc, to restore French rule to the island. Creole leaders who were defeated during the War of the South such as André Rigaud and Alexandre Pétion accompanied Leclerc's French expeditionary forces.

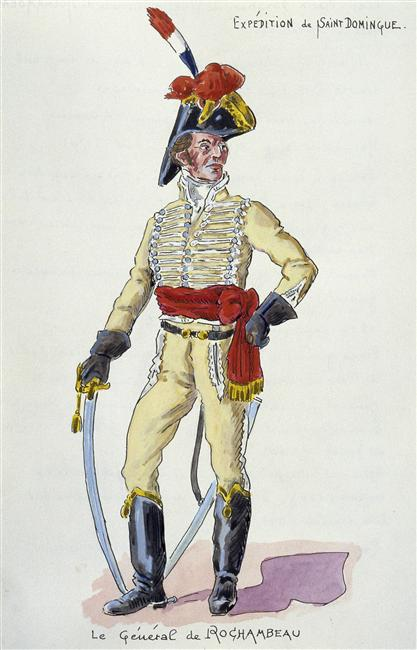
Donatien de Rochambeau in Saint-Domingue

Napoleon wanted to take control of Saint-Domingue again through diplomatic means. In late January 1802, Leclerc arrived and asked permission to land at Cap-Français, but Henri Christophe prevented him. At the same time, Donatien de Rochambeau suddenly attacked Fort-Liberté, effectively quashing the diplomatic option and starting a new war in Saint-Domingue.

Both Louverture and Dessalines fought against the French expeditionary forces, but after the Battle of Crête-à-Pierrot, Dessalines defected from his long-time ally Louverture and joined Leclerc's forces. Leclerc proclaimed peaceful intentions, but kept secret his orders to deport black officers holding a rank above captain.

Eventually, a ceasefire was enacted between Louverture and the French expeditionary forces. During this ceasefire, Louverture was captured & arrested. Jean-Jacques Dessalines was at least partially responsible for Louverture's arrest, as asserted by several authors, including Louverture's son, Isaac. On 22 May 1802, after Dessalines learned that Louverture had failed to instruct a local rebel leader to lay down his arms per the recent ceasefire agreement, he immediately wrote to Leclerc to denounce Louverture's conduct as "extraordinary".

Leclerc originally asked Dessalines to arrest Louverture, but he declined. Jean Baptiste Brunet was ordered to do so, and he deported Louverture and his aides to France, claiming that he suspected the former leader of plotting an uprising. Louverture warned, "In overthrowing me you have cut down in Saint-Domingue only the trunk of the tree of liberty; it will spring up again from the roots, for they are numerous and they are deep."

For a few months, the island was quiet under Napoleonic rule. But when it became apparent that the French intended to re-establish slavery, because they had done so on Guadeloupe, Dessalines and Pétion switched sides again, in October 1802, and fought against the French. In November Leclerc died of yellow fever, like much of his army; the Vicomte de Rochambeau then became the commanding officer of French expeditionary forces.

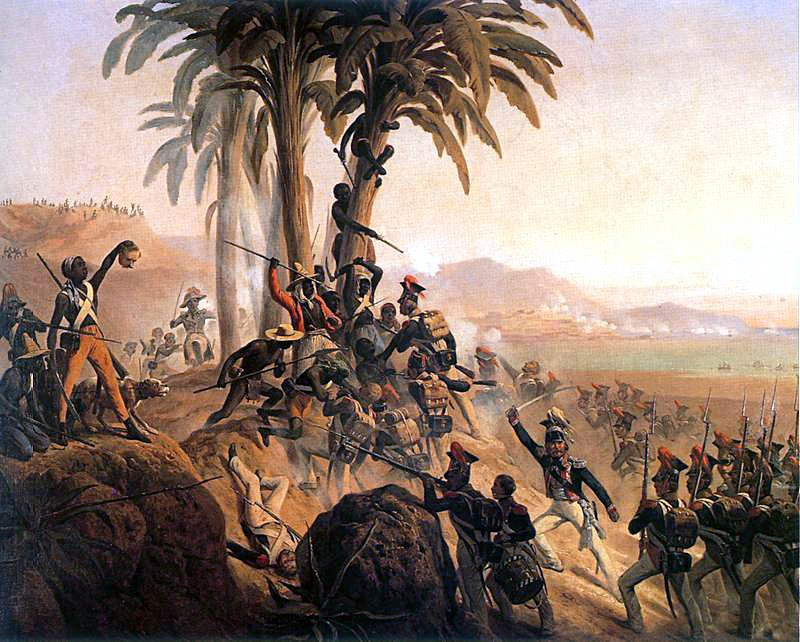
The Battle of Palm Tree Hill

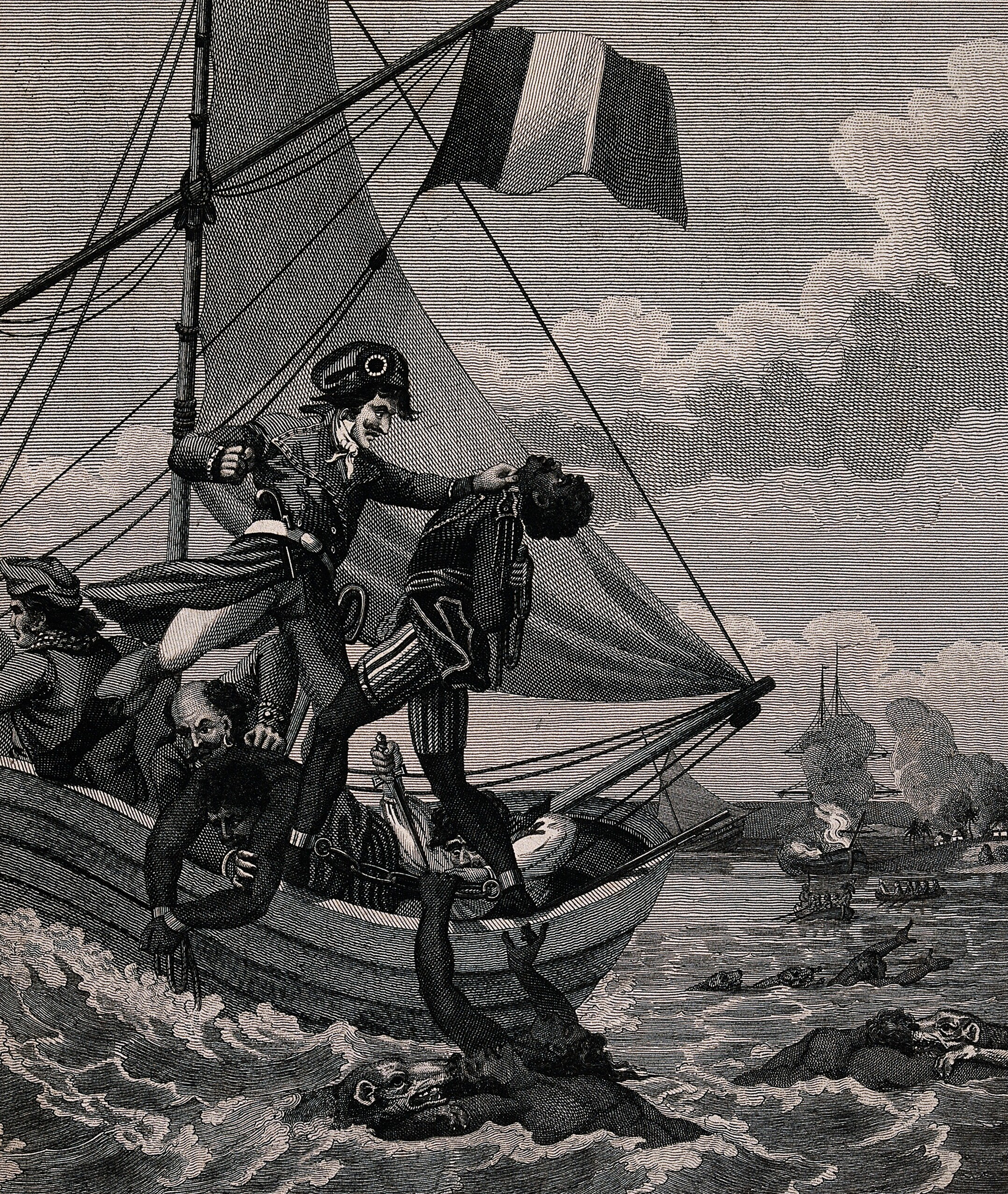
French sailors drowning Black prisoners

Rochambeau fought a brutal campaign. His atrocities helped rally many former French loyalists to the Haitian rebel cause. A passage from the personal secretary of the later King of Northern Haiti (1811–1820), Henry I describes punishments some slaves received:

Have they not hung up men with heads downward, drowned them in sacks, crucified them on planks, buried them alive, crushed them in mortars? Have they not forced them to consume faeces? And, having flayed them with the lash, have they not cast them alive to be devoured by worms, or onto anthills, or lashed them to stakes in the swamp to be devoured by mosquitoes? Have they not thrown them into boiling cauldrons of cane syrup? Have they not put men and women inside barrels studded with spikes and rolled them down mountainsides into the abyss? Have they not consigned these miserable blacks to man eating-dogs until the latter, sated by human flesh, left the mangled victims to be finished off with bayonet and poniard?

Eventually, the British allied with the Haitian revolutionaries and enacted a naval blockade on the French forces. Dessalines led the Haitian revolution until its completion, when the French forces were finally defeated in 1803. The last battle of the Haitian Revolution, the Battle of Vertières, occurred on 18 November 1803, near Cap-Haïtien. When the French withdrew, they had only 7,000 troops left to ship to France.

In 1804, the remaining white French people in Saint-Domingue were massacred under Dessalines' orders. Ex-slaves or Creoles who declared to be traitors to Dessalines' rule were also killed.

==== Slaughter of the remaining French whites in Saint-Domingue ====
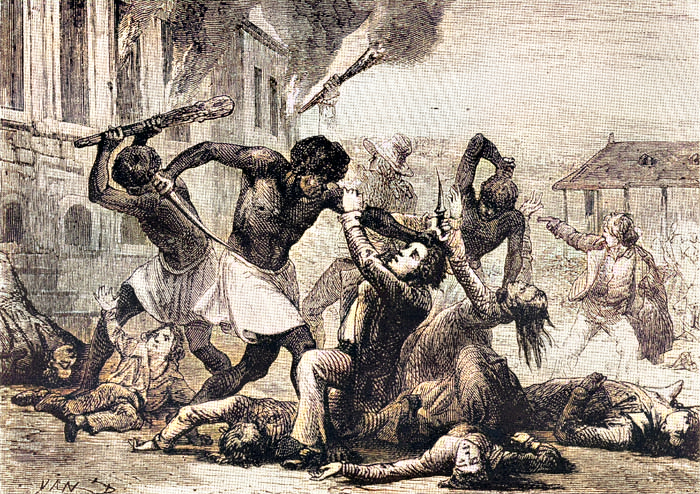
Jean-Jacques Dessalines ordered the genocide of Whites

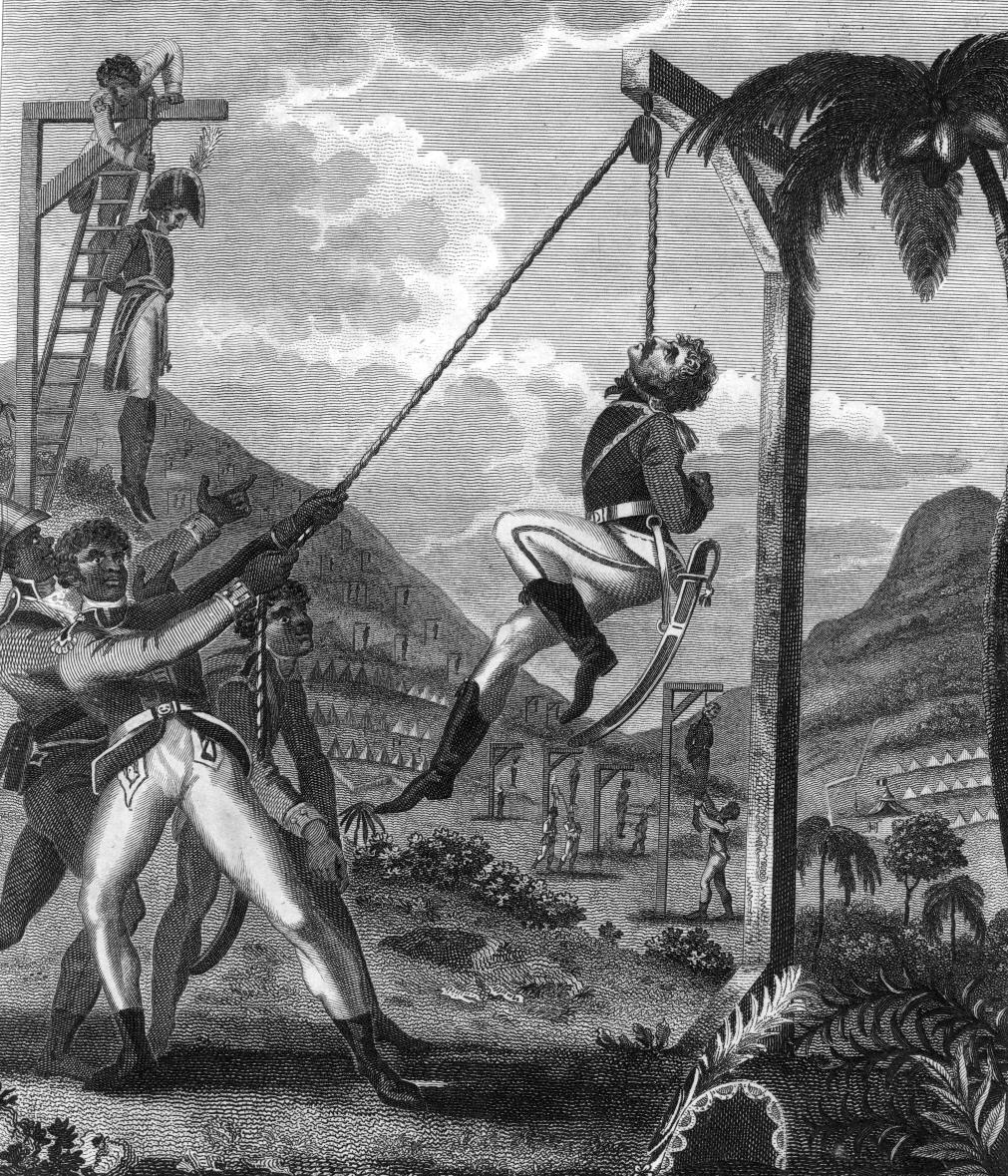
Revenge taken by the Black Army for the Cruelties practised on them by the French, 1805 illustration

Between February and April 1804, Governor-General Jean-Jacques Dessalines ordered the deaths of all remaining French whites in Haiti. He decreed that all those suspected of collaborating with the French army should be put to death, including free people of color and freed slaves deemed traitors to Dessalines' regime. Dessalines gave the order to the cities of Haiti that all white people should also be put to death. The weapons used should be silent weapons such as knives and bayonets rather than gunfire, so that the killing could be done more quietly, and avoid warning intended victims by the sound of gunfire and thereby giving them the opportunity to escape.

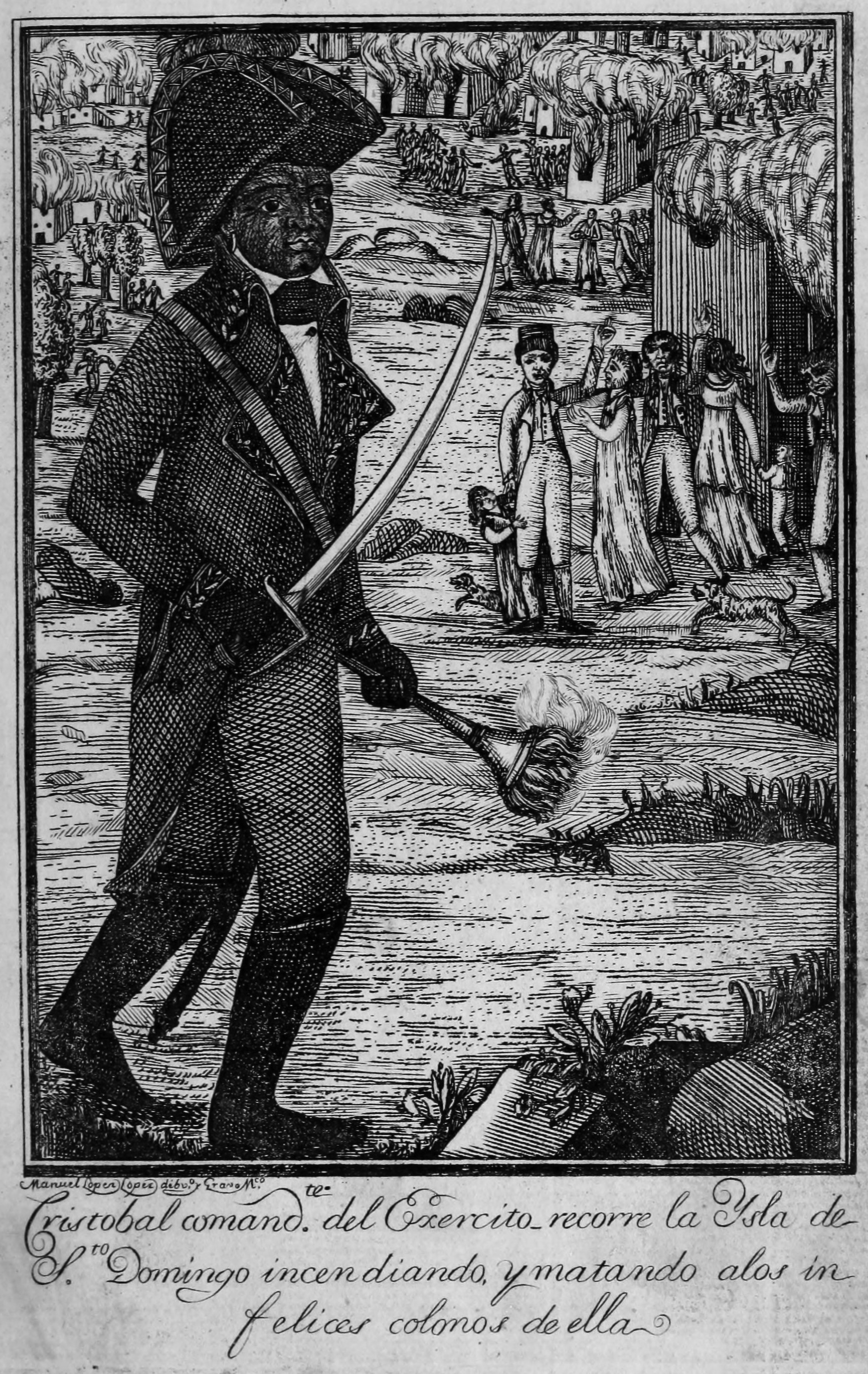
Henri Christophe rounding up the White colonists

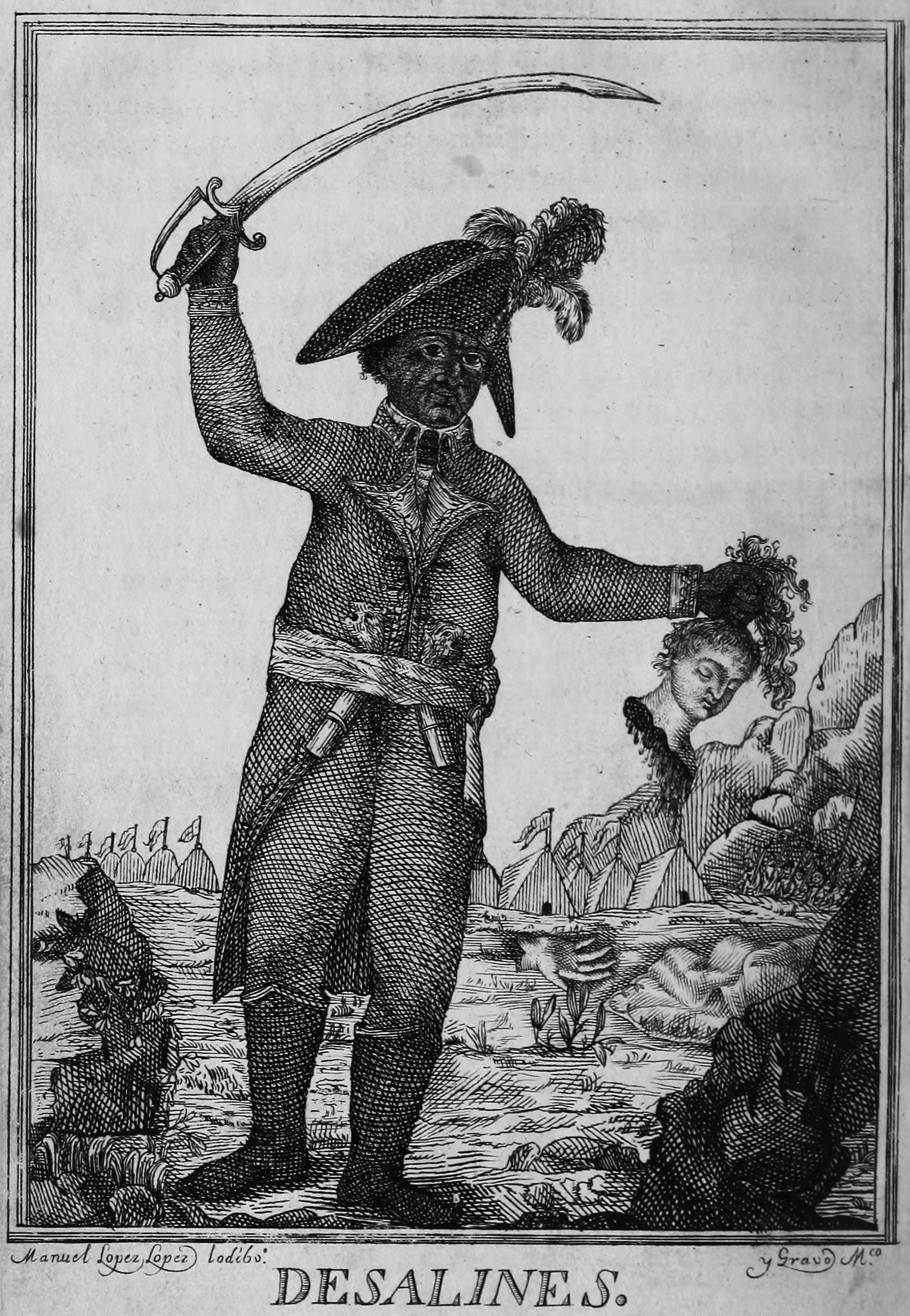
Jean-Jacques Dessalines decapitating a White woman and raising her head

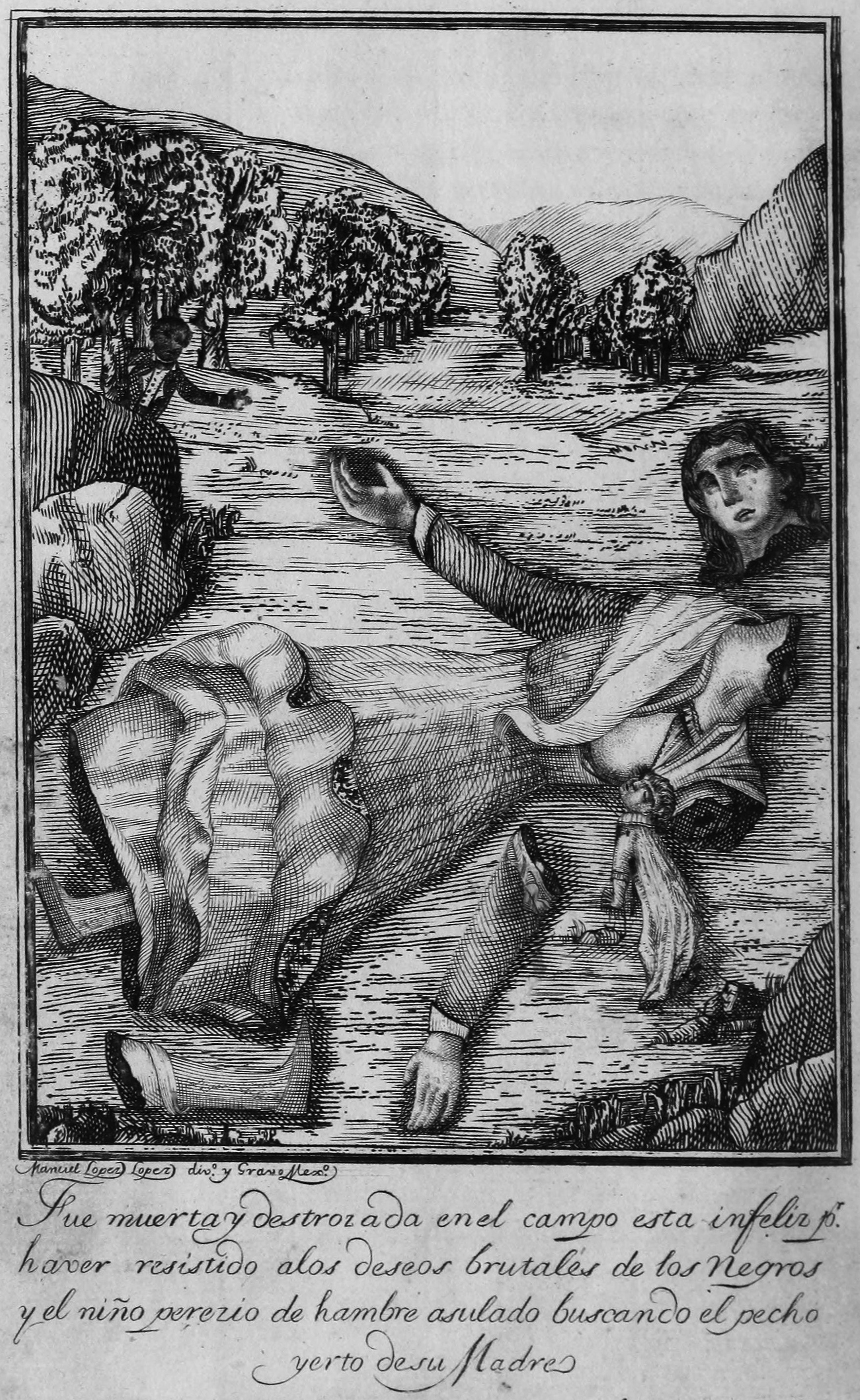
A mutilated mother killed with her starving child perishing from starvation

From early January 1804 until 22 April 1804, squads of soldiers moved from house to house throughout Haiti, torturing and killing entire families. Eyewitness accounts of the massacre describe imprisonment and killings even of whites who had been friendly and sympathetic to the Haitian Revolution.

The course of the massacre showed an almost identical pattern in every city he visited. Before his arrival, there were only a few killings, despite his orders. When Dessalines arrived, he demanded that his orders about mass killings of the area's white population should be put into effect. Reportedly, he ordered the unwilling to take part in the killings, especially men of mixed race, so that the blame should not be placed solely on the black population. Mass killings took place on the streets and in places outside the cities.

In parallel to the killings, plundering and rape also occurred. Women and children were generally killed last. White women were "often raped or pushed into forced marriages under threat of death."

Dessalines did not specifically mention that the white women should be killed, and the soldiers were reportedly somewhat hesitant to do so. In the end, however, the women were also put to death, though normally at a later stage of the massacre than the adult males. The argument for killing the women was that whites would not truly be eradicated if the white women were spared to give birth to new Frenchmen.

Before his departure from a city, Dessalines would proclaim an amnesty for all the whites who had survived in hiding during the massacre. When these people left their hiding place, however, they were murdered as well. Some whites were, nevertheless, hidden and smuggled out to sea by foreigners. There were notable exceptions to the ordered killings. A contingent of Polish defectors were given amnesty and granted Haitian citizenship for their renouncement of French allegiance and support of Haitian independence. Dessalines referred to the Poles as "the White Negroes of Europe", as an expression of his solidarity and gratitude.

==== Empire of Haiti (1804–1806) ====
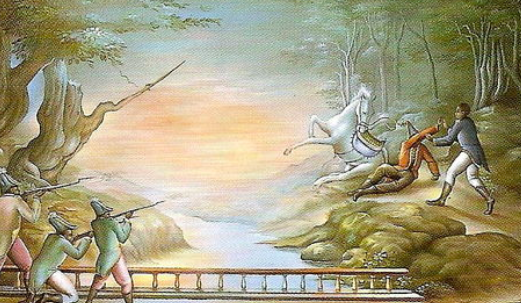
The assassination of Emperor Jean-Jacques Dessalines, 17 October 1806

Dessalines was crowned Emperor Jacques I of the Haitian Empire on 6 October 1804 in the city of Cap-Haïtien. On 20 May 1805, his government released the Imperial Constitution, naming Jean-Jacques Dessalines emperor for life with the right to name his successor. Dessalines declared Haiti to be an all-black nation and forbade whites from ever owning property or land there. The generals who served under Dessalines during the Haitian Revolution became the new planter class of Haiti.

In order to slow the economic collapse of Haiti, Dessalines enforced a harsh regimen of plantation labor on newly freed slaves. Dessalines demanded that all blacks work either as soldiers to defend the nation or return to the plantations as labourers, so as to raise commodity crops such as sugar and coffee for export to sustain his new empire. His forces were strict in enforcing this, to the extent that some black subjects felt they were enslaved again. Haitian society became feudal in nature as workers could not leave the land they worked.

Dessalines was assassinated on 17 October 1806 by rebels led by Haitian generals Henri Christophe and Alexandre Pétion; his body was found dismembered and mutilated. Dessalines' murder did not solve the tensions in Haiti; instead, the country was torn into two new countries led by each general. The Northern State of Haiti (later the Kingdom of Haiti) maintained forced plantation labor and became rich, while the Southern Republic of Haiti abandoned forced plantation labor and collapsed economically.

== Aftermath ==
The Haitian Revolution culminated in the elimination of slavery in Saint-Domingue and the founding of the Haitian Empire in the whole of Hispaniola. Having sold the Louisiana Territory to the United States in April 1803, Napoleon lost interest in his failing ventures in the Western Hemisphere.

Between 1791 and 1810, more than 25,000 Saint-Dominican Creoles – planters, poorer whites ("petits blancs"), and free people of color ("gens de couleur libres"), as well as the slaves who accompanied them – fled the island, primarily to the United States in 1793, Jamaica in 1798, and Cuba in 1803. Many of them found their way to Louisiana, with the largest wave of refugees, more than 10,000 people – almost equally divided among whites, free people of color, and slaves – arriving in New Orleans between May 1809 and January 1810 after being expelled from Cuba, nearly doubling the population of the city. These refugees had a significant impact on the culture of Louisiana, including developing its sugar industry and cultural institutions.

On 17 April 1825, the French king (Charles X) issued a decree stating France would recognize Haitian independence, but only at the price of 150 million francs – 10 times the amount the U.S. had paid for the Louisiana Territory. The sum was meant to compensate the French colonists for their lost revenues from slavery. Newspaper articles from the period reveal that the French king knew the Haitian government was hardly capable of making these payments, as the total was more than 10 times Haiti's annual budget. Baron de Mackau, whom Charles X sent to deliver the ordinance, arrived in Haiti in July, accompanied by a squadron of 14 brigs of war carrying more than 500 cannons. With the threat of violence looming, on 11 July 1825, Haitian president Jean-Pierre Boyer signed the document, which stated, "The present inhabitants of the French part of St. Domingue shall pay … in five equal installments … the sum of 150,000,000 francs, destined to indemnify the former colonists." Researchers have found that the independence debt and the resulting drain on the Haitian treasury were directly responsible not only for the underfunding of education in 20th-century Haiti, but also lack of health care and the country's inability to develop public infrastructure.

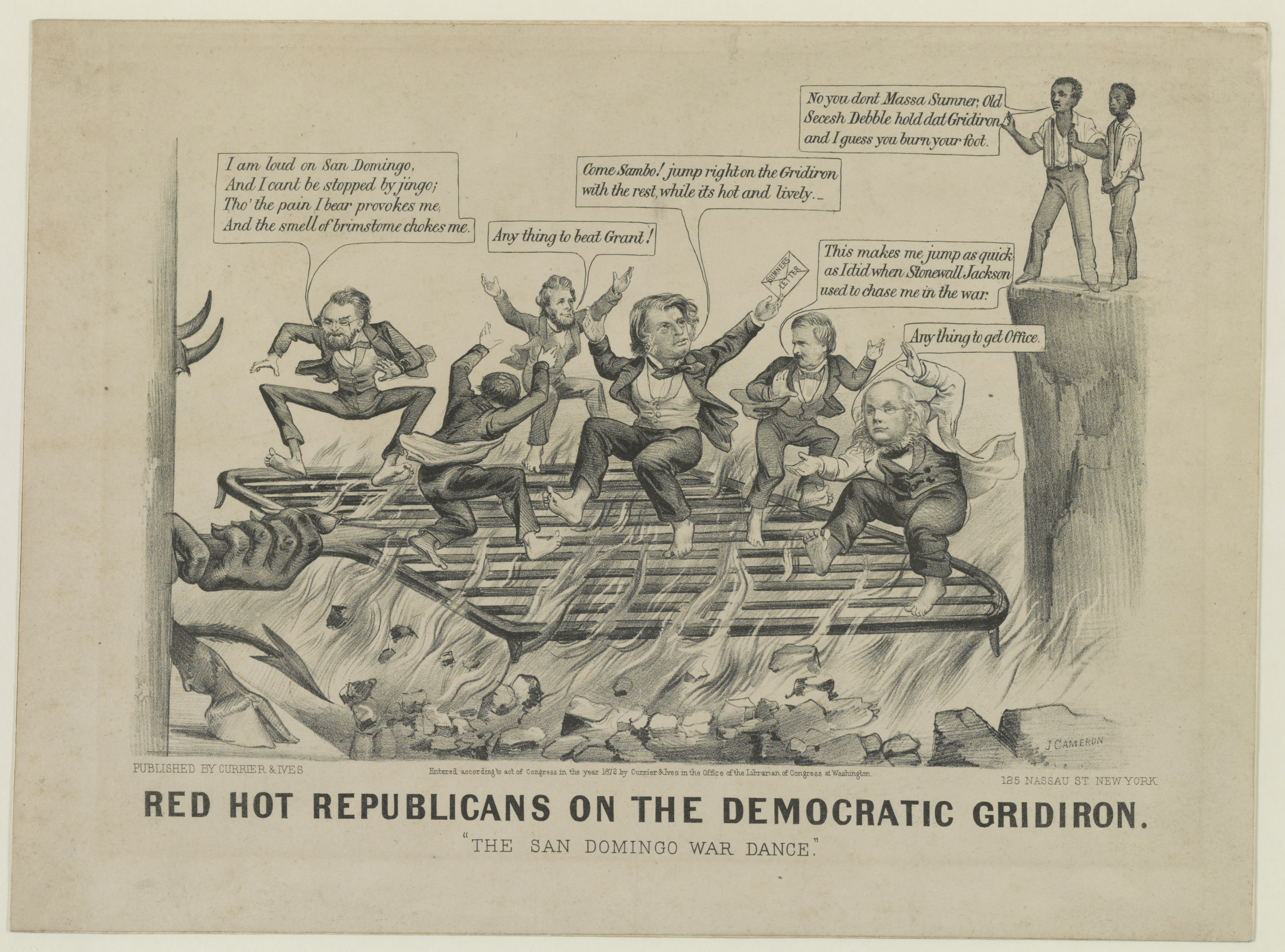
A Democratic publication of Republicans dancing the "San Domingo" war dance for freed slaves, 1872.

In the 19th and early 20th centuries, American and British authors often referred to Saint-Domingue period as "Santo Domingo" or "San Domingo."^{:2} This led to confusion with the earlier Spanish colony, and later the contemporary Spanish colony established at Santo Domingo during the colonial period; in particular, in political debates on slavery previous to the American Civil War, "San Domingo" was used to express fears of Southern whites of a slave rebellion breaking out in their own region. Today, the former Spanish possession contemporary with the early period of the French colony corresponds mostly with the Dominican Republic, whose capital is Santo Domingo. The name of Saint-Domingue was changed to Hayti (Haïti) when Jean-Jacques Dessalines declared the independence of all Hispaniola from the French in 1804. Like the name Haiti itself, Saint-Domingue may refer to all of Hispaniola, or the western part in the French colonial period, while the Spanish version Hispaniola or Santo Domingo is often used to refer to the Spanish colonial period or the Dominican nation.

== See also ==
- French colonization of the Americas
- History of Haiti
- List of colonial governors of Saint-Domingue
- Spanish Colony of Santo Domingo
- Haitian Revolution
