= Anne-César de La Luzerne =

French soldier and diplomat (1741–1791)

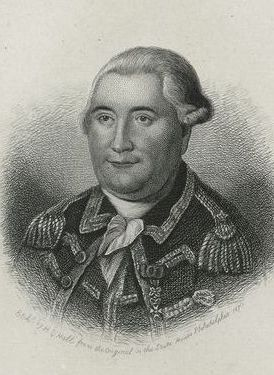
S.E. M le marquis de La Luzerne

Anne-César de La Luzerne (15 July 1741 – 14 September 1791) was an 18th-century French soldier and diplomat who had an influential role to the Continental Congress and new government of the United States of America after it gained independence from Great Britain. Descended from an illustrious Normandy family, as a Knight of Malta and the Order of Saint Louis he was styled Chevalier before King Louis XVI created him a Marquis in 1785.

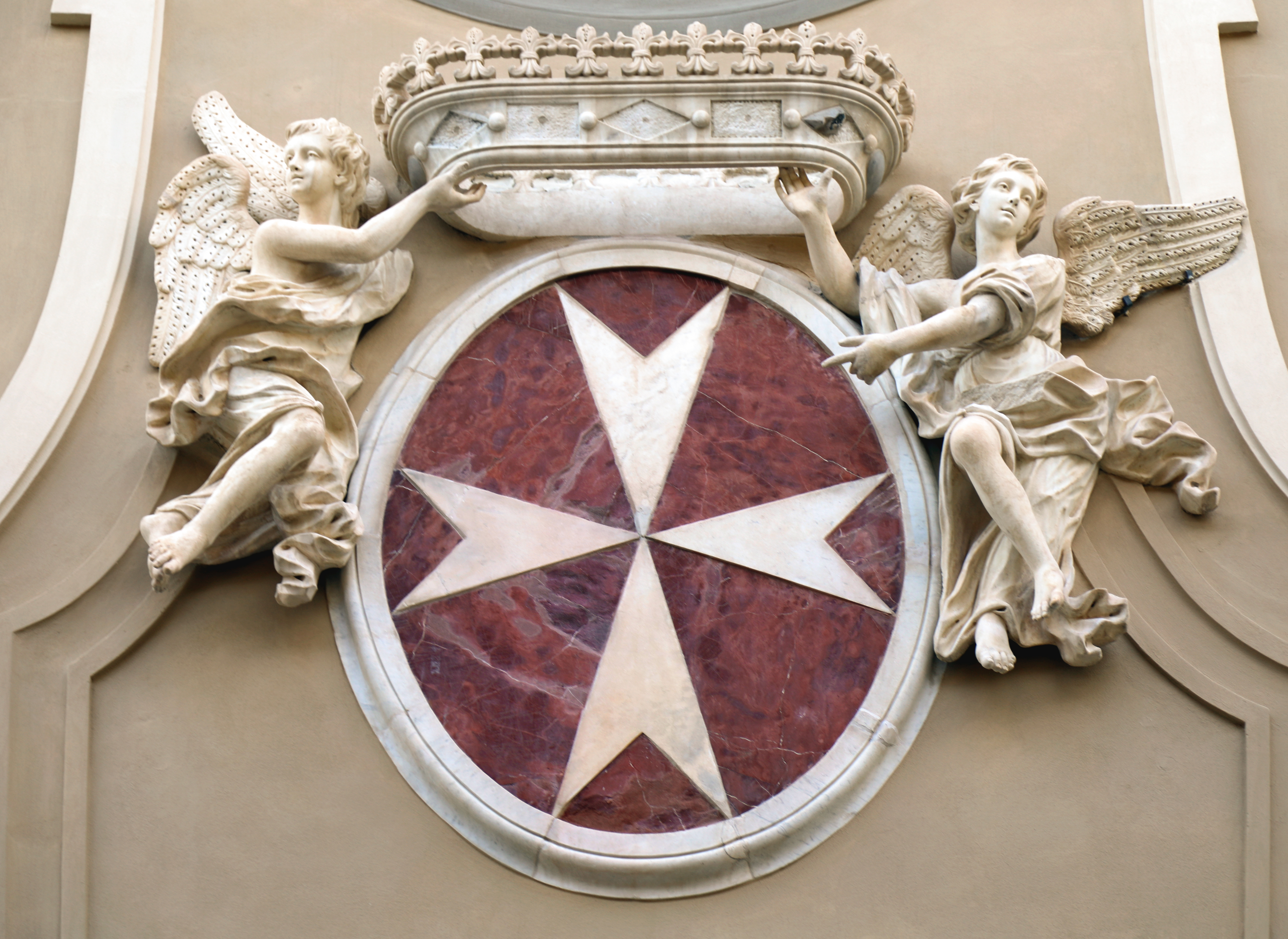
Arms of the Knights of Malta

== Biography ==
Born on 15 July 1741 in Paris, his father was César Antoine de la Luzerne, comte de Beuzeville (died 1755), a Maréchal de camp in the king's army, and his mother was Marie-Elisabeth de Lamoignon de Blancmesnil (1716–1758), the daughter of Lord Chancellor Lamoignon and the sister of the Secretary of State Malesherbes. Anne-César's brothers were César Henri, comte de La Luzerne, Naval Minister and Cardinal La Luzerne.

Anne-César de La Luzerne joined the French Royal Army in 1754 and served with distinction during the Seven Years' War. He commanded the Grenadiers royaux de France, reaching the rank of Major-General in 1762.

He entered diplomatic service as French Minister Plenipotentiary, first to Bavaria (1777–1778), and then in the United States.

=== Minister to the United States ===
In 1779 La Luzerne succeeded Conrad Alexandre Gérard de Rayneval as the French Minister to the United States and later served as the official Ambassador of France until 1784. During his time in Philadelphia, established as a base for the Continental Congress, when the British occupied New York City, he never failed to show his sympathy for the young Republic. He guaranteed a personal loan to buy food for the troops in 1780. In return he obtained, in 1782, the agreement that the American Continental Congress should not ratify any peace treaty with Great Britain until agreement was reached between France and Britain. He arranged for a requiem Mass after the death of Juan de Miralles (a Spanish representative to the Continental Congress), at St. Mary's Church in Philadelphia on 8 May 1780. That same year, he was elected as a member to the American Philosophical Society based in the same city.

La Luzerne was a major proponent of ratification of the Articles of Confederation; he felt that this new form of government would help strengthen the American state. Maryland persisted as the only state to block ratification of the Articles; they held out because some states had not yet given up claims to land west of the Appalachian Mountains. When Maryland requested France to provide naval forces in the Chesapeake Bay for protection from the British (who were conducting raids in the lower part of the bay), he indicated that French Admiral Destouches would do what he could, but La Luzerne also "sharply pressed" Maryland to ratify the Articles, thus suggesting the two issues were related. Maryland ratified the Articles in February 1781. La Luzerne also suggested that the Confederation government appoint ministers of war, finance, and foreign affairs. He was assisted by General and Congressman John Sullivan

La Luzerne returned to Europe in 1784, his reputation as an envoy much enhanced. In 1789, Thomas Jefferson, the first U.S. Secretary of State, sent La Luzerne a letter of thanks on behalf of President George Washington. In 1788 La Luzerne was posted as Ambassador to the Court of St. James's in London, and died on 14 September 1791 at Southampton.

== Legacy and honors ==
- In 1781 he was elected an Honorary Fellow of the American Academy of Arts and Sciences, and in 1783 he was a founding Fellow of the Society of the Cincinnati.
- Luzerne County, Pennsylvania, the Borough of Luzerne, Pennsylvania, and Lake Luzerne, New York, are named after him.

== See also ==
- List of ambassadors of France to the United States
- List of Ambassadors of France to the United Kingdom
