= César Guillaume de La Luzerne =

His Eminence César Guillaume de La Luzerne
- Bishop of Langres
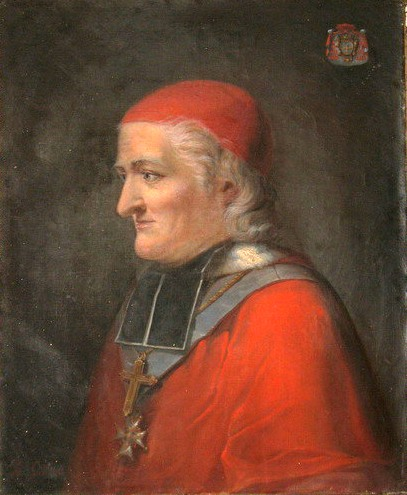
- Portrait du cardinal de La Luzerne, B. Guidel, École française, XVIII^{e} siècle, chapelle du couvent des Annonciades de Langres

Orders
- Ordination: 27 March 1762
- Consecration: 30 September 1770 by Christophe de Beaumont du Repaire

Personal details
- Born: 7 July 1738 Paris; Société d'Ancien Régime
- Died: 21 June 1821 (aged 82) Paris
- Denomination: Roman Catholic

César-Guillaume La Luzerne (7 July 1738 - 21 June 1821) was a Roman Catholic clergyman. He was a minor statesman of the French Revolution, and a cardinal and important figure of the Bourbon Restoration.

== Family and early life ==
La Luzerne's father, Cesar-Antoine, was a Maréchal de camp in the king's army. His mother was Marie-Elisabeth de Lamoignon de Blancmesnil (1716–1758), the daughter of Lord Chancellor Lamoignon (served 1750–1768) and the sister of the Secretary of State Malesherbes. His brothers were César Henri, comte de La Luzerne, Naval Minister (1787–1790) and Anne-César, ambassador to the United States and to the court of London.

Cesar-Guillaume was the middle son and so intended by his family to go into the church, and so attended the seminary of Saint-Magloire. In 1754, while Cesar-Guillaume was still a young man, his grandfather arranged his appointment to the position of Canon of Notre Dame Cathedral. In 1756, he was named abbot of Mortemer Abbey. His studies at Collège de Navarre continued throughout this time, and he so distinguished himself that when, in 1762, Arthur Richard Dillon was appointed Archbishop of Narbonne, he chose La Luzerne for his Great Vicar.

In 1765, he was named Agent-General of the Clergy of the ecclesiastical province of Vienne, a very challenging position at that time, because of the challenges that occurred between the clergy and the parlements. His closest ally in these struggles was Jérôme Champion de Cicé.

== Bishop of Langres ==
On 24 June 1770 the king appointed La Luzerne to the very prestigious position of Duke-Bishop of Langres, (an ancient French peerage). Despite the promotion he remained Canon of Notre Dame and in this capacity performed many state funerals including that of Louis XV in 1774.

La Luzerne took his duties very seriously and invested heavily in renovations to church property, establishing seminaries, and conducting synods and assemblies. Catholicism flourished in his diocese during his term.

As a Duke-Bishop he had a right to participate in the Assembly of Notables (1787–1788).

== French Revolution ==
La Luzerne was elected by the Second Estate of the bailiwick of Langres to the Estates-General (1789). He was from the very beginning an opponent of the doubling of the Third Estate and of the union of orders, and despaired at the foundation of the National Assembly. He was elected president of the assembly (31 August 1789 - 9 September) but resigned within days in protest of a speech made by the marquis de Lally-Tollendall. He withdrew from the National Assembly after the October Days (5–6 October 1789) and officially resigned in December 1789.

In 1791, he refused to take the constitutional oath; his opposition to the reorganisation of the church seriously damaged its viability, and he united opposition under him. He soon after fled France, emigrating to Constance and Venice, where he gave hospitality to French exiles and wrote extensively. Under the Restoration he returned to France, became cardinal and state minister (1817) and was re-appointed to the See of Langres which he had resigned at the time of the Concordat.

== Works ==
An apologist and a lucid expounder of Catholic faith and Christian ethics, La Luzerne, like Denis-Luc Frayssinous, Talleyrand-Périgord and Bausset, was a belated representative of the old Gallicanism. His efforts to revive it failed, owing partly to the fall of the Bourbons and partly because of the writers who, in "L'Avenir" and other publications, gave to France a definite Roman orientation.

His principal works are:

- Oraison funèbre de Louis XV (Paris, 1774)
- Considérations sur divers points de la morale chrétienne (Venice, 1795–1799)
- Explication des évangiles des dimanches et des fetes (Venice, 1807)
- Sur la déclaration de l’Assemblée du Clergé de France en 1682 (Paris, 1821).

== Sources ==
- Vie de la Luzerne in Migne, Démonstrations Évangéliques
- Deimie in Encyclopédie du XIX siècle, s. v.
- René François Rohrbacher, Histoire Universelle de l'Église Catholique, ed. Gaume, IV (Paris, 1869), 623
- Belamy, La théologie Catholique au XIXe siècle (Paris, 1904
- Baunard, Un siècle de l'Église de France (Paris, 1902)

Attribution
