= French frigate Capricieuse (1786) =

History

France
- Name: Capricieuse
- Builder: Lorient shipyard
- Launched: 20 November 1786
- Commissioned: 1787
- Renamed: Charente, September 1793
- Fate: Wrecked 31 October 1799

General characteristics
- Type: Frigate
- Displacement: 1,100 tonneaux
- Tons burthen: 600 port tonneaux
- Armament: 36 guns

Capricieuse was a 36-gun frigate of the French Navy, lead ship of her class. She was launched in Lorient, France, on 20 November 1786 and commissioned under Captain de Ferrières in 1787.

In 1788, Capricieuse accidentally ran aground. She was refloated in 1789.

In February 1791, Capricieuse took a station in Saint-Domingue, from which she returned in October 1792, carrying the former governor of Saint-Domingue, General Philibert François Rouxel de Blanchelande, to France so that he could be tried for counter-revolutionary actions.

In September 1793, Capricieuse was renamed Charente and manned by the crew of the French Navy frigate Néréide. She took part in the Croisière du Grand Hiver and in the Expédition d'Irlande, where she shadowed Trajan.

In 1798, Charente was used to ferry detainees to Cayenne in French Guiana. In late March 1798, under Commander Bruillac, she battled a Royal Navy force off Gironde, France.

Charente was lost on 31 October 1799, when she ran aground at the entrance of the river Blavet on the Brittany coast of France.
