= Alexandre de Vincent de Mazade =

French soldier

Governor of Saint-Domingue (acting)
- In office November 1787 – 22 December 1788
- Preceded by: César Henri, comte de La Luzerne
- Succeeded by: Marie-Charles du Chilleau

Governor of Saint-Domingue (acting)
- In office July 1789 – 19 August 1789
- Preceded by: Marie-Charles du Chilleau
- Succeeded by: Antoine de Thomassin de Peynier

Personal details
- Born: 1735 Saint-Péray, Ardèche, France
- Died: 1808 (aged 72–73) Saint-Thomas, Haute-Garonne
- Occupation: Soldier

Alexandre de Vincent de Mazade (or Mazarade; 1735–1808) was a French soldier who was twice acting governor of the French colony of Saint-Domingue between 1787 and 1789.

== Early years ==
Alexandre de Vincent de Mazade was born in Saint-Péray, Ardèche, France, in 1735. His parent were Louis de Vincent de Mazade (died 1779) and Françoise Victoire de Geys de Montguillard. On 31 December 1779 he married Marie Thérèse Sophie Chappotin (born 1757) in Port-au-Prince, Saint-Domingue. His wife was a Creole, so he belonged to the class of proprietors of the colony. He owned shares in a sugar company in Terrier-Rouge and several coffee plantations in the Western Province.

Vincent de Mazade became a maréchal de camp. He was made a knight of the Order of Saint Louis. In the 1780s he was a brigadier in the king's armies, second-in-command in Port-au-Prince, commander of the western part of the island and commander of the French Leeward Islands (Îles Sous-le-Vent). He had a good military reputation.

== Governor of Saint-Domingue ==
Vincent succeeded César Henri, comte de La Luzerne in November 1787, as acting governor. He was Governor of Santo Domingo from November 1787 to July 1789. François Barbé-Marbois was the intendant, or head of civil administration, during this period. One of the problems Vincent and Marbois had to handle was the extreme cruelty that the planter Lejeune inflicted on his slaves, in violation of the laws of Saint-Domingue. A conviction could be viewed as an indictment of the institution of slavery, and would humiliate the planters in the eyes of their slaves. There would be a danger that the slaves would refuse to obey orders, and the whole system would break down. This was not an isolated incident. They ordered deportation of the planter Maguero for barbarities against his slaves, and wrote that there were other cases that were even more serious, but did not have the "clarity" afforded by the planter's confession.

Marie-Charles du Chilleau, the Marquis du Chilleau, was appointed Governor General in March 1788. He did not arrive in the colony until the end of the year, and remained only until the beginning of July 1789. Vincent was replaced by Antoine de Thomassin de Peynier in August 1789.

== Later activity ==
Vincent de Mazade was commander of the northern part of the colony in 1789. He tolerated the sedition of Jean-Jacques Bacon de la Chevalerie, but dissolved the insurrectionist Assembly of Saint-Marc, or Léopardins, in 1790. (Note: In February 1790 the planters started to organize elections for a colonial assembly, which met in Saint-Marc and on 14 April 1790 declared it was the General Assembly of Saint Domingue. In 28 May the Assembly declared that Saint Domingue was now a federative ally of France rather than a subject. The governor declared the Assembly to be a traitor to the nation, and assembled his troops to forcibly dissolve it.)

Vincent de Mazade died in Saint-Thomas, Haute-Garonne in 1808.

== Sources ==
- Biondi, Carminella (15 August 2016), 1789 : les colonies ont la parole Anthologie Tome 1: Colonies; Gens de couleur, Editions L'Harmattan, ISBN 978-2-14-001623-3
- Fick, Carolyn E. (1990), The Making of Haiti: The Saint Domingue Revolution from Below, Univ. of Tennessee Press, ISBN 978-0-87049-667-7
- Ghachem, Malick W. (November 2011), "Prosecuting Torture: The Strategic Ethics of Slavery in Pre-Revolutionary Saint-Domingue (Haiti)", Law and History Review, 29 (4, Law, Slavery, and Justice: A Special Issue), American Society for Legal History: 985–1029, doi:10.1017/S0738248011000514, JSTOR 23064120, S2CID 145806113
- Ghachem, Malick W. (5 March 2012), The Old Regime and the Haitian Revolution, Cambridge University Press, ISBN 978-0-521-83680-7
- Gliech, Oliver (2011), Saint-Domingue und die Französische Revolution: das Ende der weißen Herrschaft in einer karibischen Plantagenwirtschaft (in German), Böhlau Verlag Köln Weimar, ISBN 978-3-412-20679-6
- Lacroix, Pamphile vicomte de (1 January 1995), La Révolution de Haïti, KARTHALA Editions, ISBN 978-2-86537-571-4
- Prue, Michel, "Alexandre de Vincent de Mazade", Geneanet (in French)
- "Saint-Domingue. Gouverneurs généraux", Haïti mémoire et culture (in French)
- "Vincent de Mazade (Alexandre de), gouverneur de Saint-Domingue de 1787 à 1788 (1787/1789)", ANOM: Archives nationales de outre-mer (in French)
- Y.B. du Buc de Mannetot (2013), Documents sur le comte Jean-Baptiste-César du Buc de Saint Olympe, dit "Dubuc Saint-Olympe" (in French), Editions du Buc
