= Antoine de Thomassin de Peynier =

French colonial administrator (1731–1809)

Antoine de Thomassin Comte de Peynier
- Born: 27 September 1731; Aix-en-Provence
- Died: 11 October 1809 (aged 78); Arance
- Military career
- Allegiance: Kingdom of France
- Branch: French Navy
- Service years: 1744–1792
- Rank: Chef d'escadre
- Conflicts: War of the Austrian Succession; Seven Years' War; American Revolutionary War
- Awards: Commander of the Order of Saint Louis; Order of Cincinnatus

Governor of Saint-Domingue
- In office 19 August 1789 – November 1790
- Preceded by: Alexandre de Vincent de Mazade
- Succeeded by: Philibert François Rouxel de Blanchelande

Louis Antoine de Thomassin de Peynier (French pronunciation: [lwi ɑ̃twan də tɔmasɛ̃ də penje]), known as Antoine de Thomassin, comte de Peynier (27 September 1731 – 11 October 1809) was an officer of the French Royal Navy and a colonial administrator of the Kingdom of France.

== Biography ==
=== Early years in the French Royal Navy ===
Peynier joined the Navy in 1744, aged just 13, taking part in the War of the Austrian Succession. In 1751, he was promoted to Ensign, and assigned a diplomatic mission in the Mediterranean between May and September 1752. Serving on the 64-gun Triton, he called the ports of Tripoli, Smyrna, Tunis, and Algiers.

When the Seven Years' War broke out in 1756, Antoine was on a four-year campaign in the Indies. During that mission, in 1757, he was promoted to lieutenant. In 1759, he was shot in the head, sustaining a lasting and debilitating injury.

After the Treaty of Paris restored peace in 1763, Peynier was given command of the 32-gun frigate Malicieuse, making a voyage of exploration and diplomacy in the Lesser Antilles. He arrived at Martinique in March 1765 and remained in the area until the summer of 1766. The governor of Guadeloupe, Count de Nolivos, gave him several diplomatic missions in that time.

In May 1765, he was sent as an ambassador to the British governor of Grenada, Robert Melvill, while also spying on British military and naval forces on the island. His instructions stipulated: "Without compromising the flag of his Majesty, he will acquire all possible knowledge of the English islands that he will approach [...]". After Grenada, Antoine de Thomassin sailed to the Spanish Coast of South America, visiting the ports of Cumaná and Caracas until June 1765. His goal was to explore and open new maritime routes to trade, especially to supply the French colonies with mules. On his return leg, he stopped at Dominica to inquire about the situation of the French on this island.

Peynier was then stationed in Guadeloupe for a while. His Sextius, who served as a Lieutenant on Malicieuse, died at that time. He was buried on 16 August 1765 at the cemetery of the Moule.

In January and February 1766, Peynier conducted reconnaissance of Saint Martin, sounding the seabed as to improve the defences of the island. He mapped the coast of the island, and in April 1766, he similarly mapped the coasts of Guadeloupe.

In 1772 he was promoted to captain.

=== American Revolutionary War ===
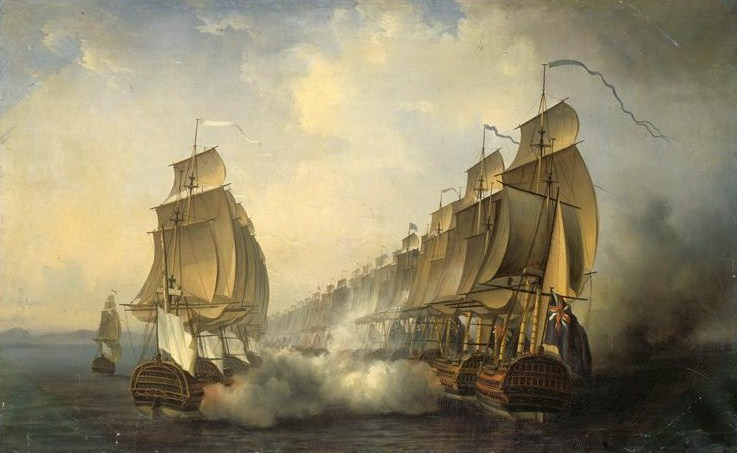
The Battle of Gondelour 20 June 1783, which Peynier participated under the command of Suffren. The latter leads the 16 ships of his squadron to victory against the 18 of Hughes. 1836 painting by Auguste Jugelet (1805-1875).

In 1778, France entered the American Revolutionary War, triggering an Anglo-French War. In 1780, at the request of Lafayette, France sent a 38-ship squadron under De Grasse, ferrying 7,000 men under Lieutenant-General Rochambeau. Peynier took part in the Battle of Martinique on 17 April 1780, commanding the 64-gun Artésien.

With the outbreak of the Fourth Anglo-Dutch War in 1780, France and the Dutch Republic found themselves allied against the Kingdom of Great Britain. The Dutch expected the British to send an expeditionary force to try and capture their Dutch Cape Colony, and Suffren was given command of a 5-ship squadron to reinforce it. Peynier became the commander of the second wave of reinforcements sent to Suffren in 1782. Although the British captured part of the convoy, Peynier managed to land troops at the Dutch Cape Colony and sailed on to make his junction with Suffren. At the Battle of Cuddalore on 20 June 1783, Peynier was captain of the fleet for the van of the French squadron, with his flag on the 74-gun Fendant.

At the Peace of Paris, Suffren was recalled to France, and Thomassin de Peynier kept command of the French fleet in the Indian Ocean until 1786 with the position of squadron leader, (Note: In a 1784 letter, Peynier wrote that his ship had run aground between Cuddalore and Pondicherry due to a navigation error from the officer of the watch. In this letter, he states that his health had deteriorated greatly, that he had told his brother Jean-Luc, then living in Paris, that he would do his best to transmit the news of his condition to the naval command.) which he obtained in 1784.

After the American War of Independence, Peynier went to the United States where he was admitted in the Society of the Cincinnati, receiving his diploma from George Washington.

In 1786, Peynier returned to France. The following year, he obtained the command of a frigate in Brest.

In 1787, in Béarn, he married Jeanne Timothée Marthe Angélique d'Arros d'Argelos (born 24 January 1761), daughter of Chef d'Escadre Jean-François d'Arros d'Argelos and his wife Mademoiselle de Lahaye (1726–1791). They had two daughters.

=== Governor of Saint-Domingue ===
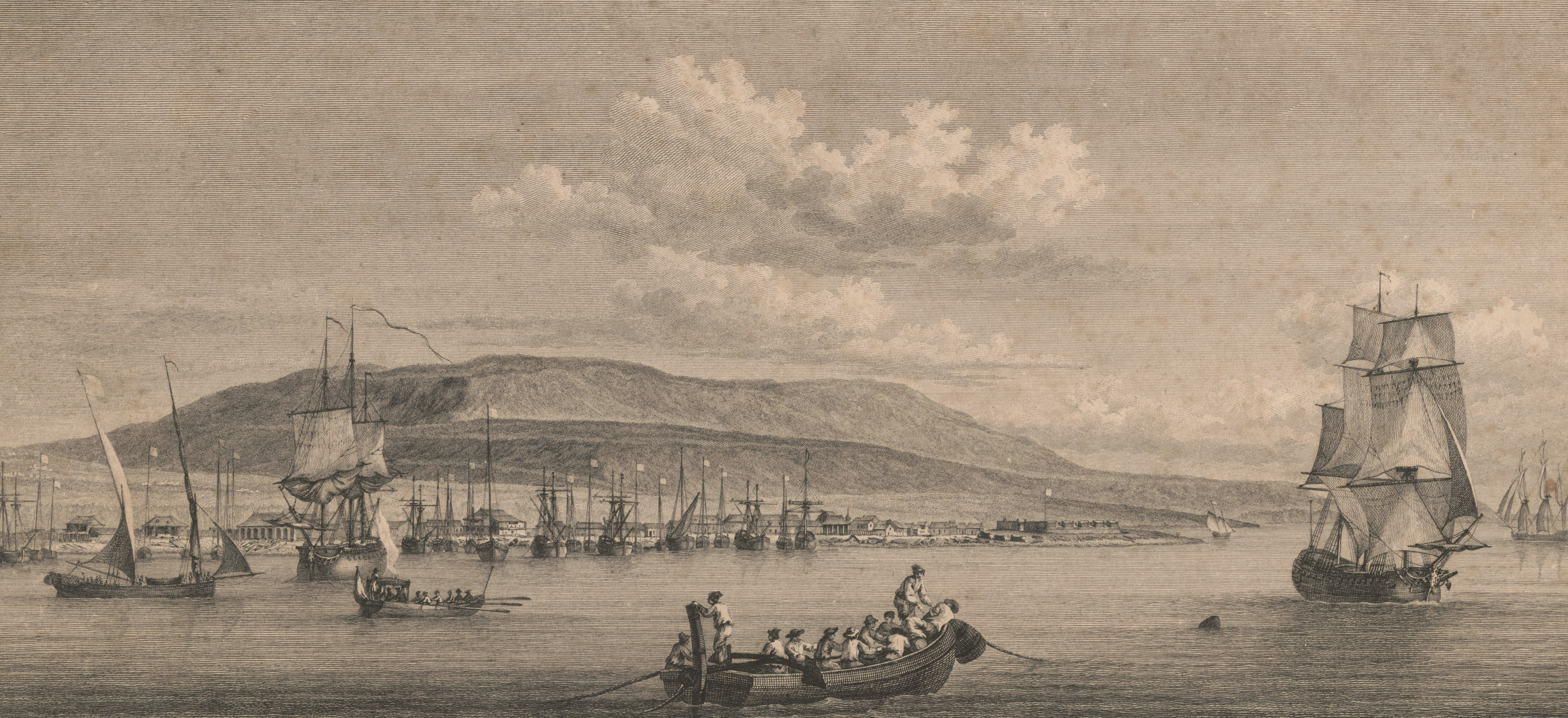
Saint-Domingue in 1780, view from the mole Saint-Nicolas. (Pierre Ozanne)

On 26 July 1789, Peynier was made governor general of the French colony of Saint-Domingue. He arrived there in late August, and remained in office until late 1790.

The political situation there was extremely tense, particularly in 1790: the 212 deputies of the Assembly of Saint-Marc started displaying more and more overt secessionist tendencies. These deputies, who were all white landowners, went as far as opening the ports of the colonies to foreign trade, which was against the laws of exclusive commerce still in force in the Kingdom of France. These White settlers were also stark supporters of slavery.

Although not very active, as a representative of the central power, Peynier opposed the Assembly. In the night of 29 to 30 July 1790, he dismissed the deputies. Eighty-five of them left the island aboard the ship Leopard and sailed to France to plead their case with the Constituent Assembly. — earning the nickname of "Leopards".

On 2 November 1790, Jean-Paul Marat wrote in the L'Ami du peuple: "It is not disputed that the Sieur de Peynier exercised a terrible despotism, that he used violence to disarm the Port-au-Prince National Guard. . [...] He armed against them the negros and the people of colour ". In France, the events of Saint-Domingue were only partially understood: most political actors did not see the Assembly of Saint-Marc as undemocratic, although it was in fact uninterested in the revolutionary ideals of the Constituent Assembly. In late 1790, White settlers openly accused Governor Peynier and Colonel Mauduit, commander of Port-au-Prince, of protecting men of colour.

Tired and sick, Peynier resigned and handed power over to Philippe François Rouxel de Blanchelande, before embarking for France, where he arrived in early 1791. He then had to report to the National Assembly, which approved of his conduct during the entire period of his governorship.

=== French Revolution ===
On 7 October 1791, took the civic oath that the National Assembly was demanding, swearing "to be faithful to the Nation, to the Law and to the King, and to maintain by all his power the constitution decreed by the National Assembly".

On 1 January 1792, Antoine de Thomassin de Peynier was promoted to vice-admiral. The following spring, he accepted command of the Brest Squadron of the French Navy, but after reconsidering, he eventually declined on the advice of the Minister Bertrand-Molleville.

He resigned from all the positions he still held, and retired after a 48-year career in the Royal Navy. He requestion a 4,300-livre pension, which he did not receive.

After the fall of the Monarchy and the proclamation of the Republic late in the summer of 1792, Peynier swore before the municipal officer of Orthez, Dutilh, "to be faithful to the Nation and to maintain freedom and equality or die by defending it". On 1 September 1793, he returned his Grand Cross of Commander in the Order of Saint Louis. Nevertheless, between late 1793 and 1794, his was under house arrest at home in Château Orthez. In his testimony to the Orthez District Revolutionary Committee, in a letter date 31 Pluviose An III (9 February 1795), he stated that this arrest stemmed from "oppressive and general measures".

In December 1794, a month his father died, Peynier moved to Aix where he hopes to restore his health. At this time, losing his sight because of his old head injury.

Peynier died on 11 October 1809 in Arance (now Mont, Pyrénées-Atlantiques).

== Origins and family ==
Antoine de Thomassin came from the house of Thomassin, a noble family from Burgundy, known from the 15th century and based in Provence. This family formed several branches, the main one being that of Marquis de Saint-Paul. Eight of its members became councilors to the Parlement of Aix-en-Provence, and one became a president. Two others became councilors to the Court of Auditors of Provence, and four became advocate-general.

Antoine de Thomassin was born on 27 September 1731 in Aix-en-Provence He was the son of Louis de Thomassin Peynier (1705–1794), Marquis de Peynier, twice intendant in the Lesser Antilles between 1763 and 1783, and Anne Dupuy de la Moutte (1705–1785). His parents married on 19 March 1726 in Aix-en-Provence. Their children were:

1. Jean-Luc de Thomassin de Peynier (1727–1807), councilor, then president of the Parlement of Aix-en-Provence (1748), baron of Trets
2. Marie Anne Thérèse, born in 1729 in Peynier
3. Alexandre Henry (1729–1736)
4. Antoine de Thomassin de Peynier
5. Marie Gabrielle de Thomassin de Peynier (1733–1772), abbess of Hyères in 1769;
6. Jacques-Louis-Auguste de Thomassin de Peynier (1734–1815), canon-count of Saint-Victor de Marseille, abbé of Aiguebelle, member of the Académie des Sciences, Arts et Belles-Lettres of Marseille;
7. Michel Marie Sextius de Thomassin de Peynier (1736–1765), knight, officer on the king's ships
8. Madeleine de Thomassin de Peynier (1737–1815), Benedictine nun
9. Marie Henriette de Thomassin de Peynier (1739–1800), who married in 1757 in Aix to Jacques-Henri de Lieuron, squire of Saint-Chamas;
10. Angélique Thérèse de Thomassin de Peynier (1744–1810), who married in 1770 in Aix to Étienne-François Baudil Senchon de Bournissac (born 1729, guillotined in 1792).
