= Léon de Sorel =

French naval officer and colonial administrator

Léon de Sorel, marquis de Sorel

Governor General of Saint Domingue
- In office 10 July 1719 – 6 December 1723
- Preceded by: Charles Joubert de La Bastide
- Succeeded by: Gaspard-Charles de Goussé, chevalier de La Rochallart

Personal details
- Born: 1655
- Died: 4 November 1743 (aged 87–88)
- Occupation: Naval officer, administrator

Léon de Sorel, (Note: Some sources wrongly give Léon de Sorel's name as Léon Dyel de Sorel. This is due to confusion with Jean Jacques Dyel, Comte de Sorel, son of Jacques Dyel du Parquet (1606–1658), first governor of Martinique. He bought the estate of Sorel in 1667 from the Duke of Chevreuse. He styled himself comte de Sorel, as did his son François Jacques and his cousin Jean Dyel de Graville Duparquel. The Dyels de Sorel were not related to Léon de Sorel.) marquis de Sorel (1655 – 4 November 1743) was a French naval officer and colonial administrator who was governor of Saint-Domingue in 1719–1723.

== Family ==
Léon marquis de Sorel (1655–1743) was from a family from the Bailiwick of Noyon. His parents were Charles, seigneur de Villiers and Jeanne du Montel. He was grandson of Robert de Sorel and Antoinette des Essarts, and great-grandson of Florent de Sorel. On 23 March 1699 in Rennes he married Marie Louise Marguerite de Marnière. They had a boy, Charles Gilles Léon (2 January 1701 – 24 May 1767). In 1708 he married Catherine Allain, widow of Cosme de Séran. His daughter Marie-Catherine married in 1729 to Jacques-Etienne-Louis Texier, Comte d'Hauteville, an army captain.

== Career ==
Léon marquis de Sorel, became a captain of the Navarre Infantry. On 3 January 1693 he was appointed inspector of naval troops at Brest, with the rank of ship-of-the-line captain (capitaine de vaisseau), one of three such inspectors in the navy. On 1 September 1718 Sorel was named governor general of Saint-Domingue, succeeding Charles Joubert de La Bastide, marquis de Chateaumorand. He was received by the council at Le Cap (Cap-Haïtien) on 10 July 1719, and by the council at Léogâne on 13 November 1719.

Soon after Sorel arrived in Saint-Domingue he approved a plan by the military engineer Amédée-François Frézier to replace the decaying barracks at Le Cap-Français with a new masonry buildings, as well as other buildings such as the powder storehouse and the king's storehouse. However, the council also had to approve the expenditure, and the colony could not afford it. Sorel pushed hard for the work to be done, and eventually the superintendent of finance, Jean-Jacques Mithon de Senneville, agreed to support it. Construction of the barracks had begun by January 1720, using stone imported as ballast from France. By August 1721 the barracks were almost complete. The total cost had been 500,000 livres, and the colony's budget was exhausted.

In 1723 Gilles, comte de Nos de Champmeslin (c. 1653–1726) was named commandant-general of all the seas, islands and the mainland of South America, while Étienne Cochard de Chastenoye, governor of Le Cap, was named interim governor-general of Saint Domingue. On 6 December 1723 Sorel was replaced by Gaspard Charles de Goussé, chevalier de La Rocheallart. Sorel was made a commander of the Order of Saint Louis.

== Sources ==
- Arnaud, E. (June 1994), "94-79 DYEL (St-Domingue; 18°)", G.H. Caraibe (in French), no. 61
- Daget, Julien (2000–2001), Les troupes de la marine, 1774-1816 (PDF) (mémoire de maîtrise) (in French), Université Paris-IV
- Desbois, François Alexandre Aubert de la Chenaye (1778), Dictionnaire de la noblesse ... de France
- Gendron, Francois; Spooner, Simon Q. (2012), 1720, Brittany to Saint-Domingue, The unfinished journey of a strategic cargo Of Nantes architecturally pre-cut building gneissic blocks (PDF), Anglo-Danish Maritime Archaeological Team
- Le Bourgeois, Ph. (September 1994), "94-79 DYEL (St-Domingue, 18°)", G.H.Caraibe (in French), no. 63
- Moreau de Saint-Méry, Médéric Louis Elie (1785), Loix et constitutions des colonies franc̜oises de l'Amérique sous le vent: 1704-1721 (in French), Chez l'auteur
- Pritchard, James S. (22 January 2004), In Search of Empire: The French in the Americas, 1670-1730, Cambridge University Press, ISBN 978-0-521-82742-3
