= François-Joseph, comte de Choiseul-Beaupré =

French naval officer

François-Joseph de Choiseul, baron de Beaupré

Governor of Saint-Domingue
- In office 28 December 1707 – 7 February 1711
- Preceded by: Jean-Pierre de Charitte
- Succeeded by: Laurent de Valernod

Personal details
- Born: 1650
- Died: 20 August 1711 (aged 60–61)
- Occupation: Naval officer, administrator

François-Joseph de Choiseul, baron de Beaupré (or comte de Choiseul-Beaupré; 1650 – 20 August 1711) was a French naval officer who was governor of Saint-Domingue (Haiti) in 1707-1710.

== Family ==
François-Joseph de Choiseul, baron de Beaupré, known as the Comte de Choisel, was the son of Louis de Choisel, baron de Beaupré, and Claire-Henriette de Mauléon-la-Bastide. He married Nicole de Stainville, his first cousin. Their children were Francois-Joseph de Choisel, marquis de Stainville, Nicole or Claire-Magdaléne de Choisel and Marie-Anne de Choisel. His wife died in Saint-Domingue while he was governor.

== Naval career ==
Choisel was present at the bombardment of Algiers, where he was taken prisoner in 1696 and exposed to the discharge of French cannons. He was taken from there and saved by an Algerian corsair named Hali, who recognised him. This corsair had once been taken by a French vessel on which the Comte de Choisel was serving as ensign, then obtained his liberty by means of Choisel. Choisel became capitaine de vaisseau in the king's navy on 21 April 1705.

== Governor of Saint-Domingue ==
Saint Domingue (Haiti)

Charles Auger, Governor of Saint Dominque, died in Léogâne on 13 October 1705 and was replaced as interim governor by Jean-Pierre de Charitte, the king's lieutenant of Tortuga and Le Cap. Choiseul was made governor of Saint-Domingue in place of the interim governor Charitte. A letter from the Secretary of State of the Navy of 27 July 1707 directed Choiseul to go to La Rochelle to await the departure of the ship that would take him to Saint Domingue, where he had just been appointed governor. Choiseul was formally appointed governor on 1 August 1706. A letter of 3 August 1707 briefed him on the meetings he would have with Charritte and Deslandes, who would tell him about the affairs of the colony and the measures he would have to take to restore discipline in the troops. He was received by the council of Le Cap on 18 December 1707, and by the council of Léogâne on 30 January 1708.

A letter of 8 October 1708 discussed Choiseul's dispute with Charritte and Mercier, his unacceptable participation in trading in blacks with Curaçao and other subjects including the appointment of M. Mithon. Further letters were critical of his unauthorized actions and abuse of power, illegal slave trading and disorder among the troops. In 1709–10 Choiseul and the intendant Jean-Jacques Mithon de Senneville (1669-1737) decided that the new town of Léogâne was to be built on two sugar plantations about half a league from the sea, with a site chosen for its good water and lack of swampland. The town was to be built on a grid layout defined by the engineer Philippe Cauvet. The first priority was to build an imposing church. At this time the settlers were often forced to lend their slaves for public works projects. Choiseul noted in a letter of 1709 about Léogâne that this was resulting in bitter complaints.

== Death and legacy ==
A letter of 23 September 1710 told Choiseul that the king had relieved him of his duties as governor of Saint-Domingue. He returned on a French ship commanded by Nicolas-François Hennequin. The transport ship was attacked by an enemy ship and taken after a fierce fight. Choiseul died of wounds on La Thétis on 18 May 1711. He was the 28th of his house to die in the service of King Louis XIV. He was taken to Havana, Cuba, where he was buried.

Nicolas de Gabaret (1641–1712), a wealthy planter and governor of Martinique, was named as his successor but refused the position. On 22 September 1710 Laurent de Valernod, governor of Grenada and commander of Tortuga and the coast of Saint-Domingue, was appointed to replace Choiseul. He was received at Le Cap on 7 February 1711, but died in Petit-Goâve on 24 May 1711. Jean-Pierre de Charite again took over as interim governor. Louis de Courbon, comte de Blénac (died 1722), arrived two years later with the new title of governor of Saint-Domingue and lieutenant-general of the islands. He was not officially appointed until 1714.

== Sources ==
- Bailey, Gauvin Alexander (6 June 2018), Architecture and Urbanism in the French Atlantic Empire: State, Church, and Society, 1604-1830, MQUP, ISBN 978-0-7735-5376-7
- Moreau de Saint-Méry, Médéric Louis Elie (1785), Loix et constitutions des colonies franc̜oises de l'Amérique sous le vent: 1704-1721, Chez l'auteur
- Moreri, Louis (1735), Supplement au grand dictionaire historique genealogique, geographique, &c., vol. 1, chez Jacques Vincent ..., Jean-Baptiste Coignard, Pierre-Gilles Lemercier, Jean-Thomas Herissant
- Moreri, Louis (1759), Title : Le grand dictionnaire historique, ou Le mélange curieux de l'histoire sacrée et profane, vol. 3, Nouvelle édition, dans laquelle on a refondu les Supplémens de M. l'abbé Goujet, le tout revu, corrigé et augmenté par M. Drouet, Paris
- Pritchard, James S. (22 January 2004), In Search of Empire: The French in the Americas, 1670-1730, Cambridge University Press, ISBN 978-0-521-82742-3
- Taillemite, Etienne, Choiseul-Beaupré (François Joseph, comte de) (in French), Archives nationales d'outre-mer
