= Marie-Charles du Chilleau =

French general and colonial administrator

Governor of Dominica
- In office 1778–1781
- Preceded by: Sir Thomas Shirley; William Stewart (acting)
- Succeeded by: Jacques Martin de Bourgon

Governor of Saint-Domingue
- In office 22 December 1788 – July 1789
- Preceded by: Alexandre de Vincent de Mazade
- Succeeded by: Alexandre de Vincent de Mazade

Personal details
- Born: 4 September 1734 Rochefort, France
- Died: 31 March 1794 (aged 59) Paris, France
- Occupation: Soldier

Marie-Charles du Chilleau d'Airvault (4 September 1734 – 31 March 1794 in Rochefort) was a French general and colonial administrator. He rose to be maréchal de camp and served as governor of Dominica and then of Saint-Domingue until being dismissed in 1789 for opposing the ban on import of foreign flour. He was arrested in the reign of Terror and died in prison.

== Family ==
Marie-Charles du Chilleau et d'Airvault was born on 4 September 1734. His parents were Gabriel Joseph du Chilleau, an officer of the guards, and Françoise Louise Anne Marie Poussard du Vigean. Marie-Charles was called Marquis du Chilleau, Marquis d'Airvault, Baron de Moins, Poplinière, etc., He married twice, first in February 1761 to Jeanne Barton de Montbas, who died the same year. His second marriage was to Jeanne Elisabeth Floride de Montulé.

== Military career ==
Chilleau fought in Germany during the Seven Years' War (1756–1763). He became a Captain of the King's Regiment, Infantry, and Guidon (flagbearer) of the Gendarmes of the Guard in April 1767. He was appointed Mestre de camp (colonel) in the cavalry on 5 April 1767. He was awarded the Grand Cross of the Order of Saint Louis. Chilleau was made commandant particulier (governor) of the island of Dominica after it was captured by the French in 1778. He was promoted to maréchal de camp on 5 December 1785.

== Governor of Saint-Domingue ==
Chilleau was governor general of Saint Domingue from 1788 to 1794, nominated to this post by César-Henri de la Luzerne, Minister of the Navy. France had suffered a series of poor harvests, and in 1789 there was an extreme shortage of flour in Saint-Domingue. On 31 March 1789 Chilleau proposed to open the ports of the colony to the import of foreign grain, although he was forbidden to do so by the French Council of State. Chilleau issued an ordinance on 9 May 1789 allowing free import of grain from the United States and other foreign countries for five years. He had the approval of the Conseil Supérieur of the colony. On 27 May 1789 he decreed that colonial produce could be used in payment, since specie was scarce.

Nicolas-Robert, Marquis de Cocherel wrote a pamphlet supporting the ordinance. The intendant, François Barbé-Marbois, who had been secretary to the French legation in the United States from 1779 to 1785, was opposed to the move. Barbé-Marbois was accused locally of profiteering from the grain crisis. Chilleau did not wait to be recalled, but left for France on 10 July 1789 to explain his decision to the Minister of the Marine and Colonies. He arrived on 23 August 1789 and was first imprisoned in Nantes, then called to Paris to explain himself. Chilleau died on 31 March 1794.

== Works ==
Surviving writings by Marie Charles Du Chilleau include:

- Du Chilleau, Marie Charles (1791), Réponse de M. Duchilleau, ancien gouverneur général de Saint-Domingue, à l'article qui le concerne dans la prétendue justification de M. de La Luzerne, ministre de la Marine, aussi ancien gouverneur de Saint-Domingue, envoyée le 18 juin au comité des rapports de l'Assemblée nationale, p. 58
- Du Chilleau, Marie Charles; Barbé de Marbois, François (1789), Correspondance de M le marquis de Chilleau, gouverneur général de Saint Domingue avec M le Comte De La Luzerne, ministre de la Marine, & M De Marbois, intendant de Saint Domingue, relativement à l'introduction de farines étrangères dans cette colonie, remise à M les députés de Saint Domingue, d'après la demande de M. le président de l'Assemblée nationale, en date du 16 septembre 1789, Paris, p. 27

== Sources ==
- Benharrech, Sarah (2015), A Colony in Crisis: The Saint-Domingue Grain Shortage of 1789, University of Maryland
- "Benjamin Franklin to the Marquis du Chilleau", Founders Online, NARA: National Archives and Records Administration, 9 November 1779
- De La Chanaye-Desbois; Badier (1864), Dictionnaire de la noblesse, contenant les généalogies, l'histoire et la chronologie des familles nobles de France,..., Schlesinger Frères
- Forrest, Alan; Middell, Matthias (16 September 2015), The Routledge Companion to the French Revolution in World History, Routledge, ISBN 978-1-317-41387-5
- Fourmont, Hyacinthe D de (1867), L'Ouest aux croisades, Vve Forest & E. Grimaud
- Landis, Dennis; Nusco, Kim; Safier, Neil; Ward, Kenneth C., Pamphlet Wars, French Revolution, The John Carter Brown Library
- Marie Charles Du Chilleau (1734-1794) (in French), BnF: Bibliotheque nationale de France
- Pierfit, "Marie Charles du Chilleau", Geneanet (in French)
