= Léopardins =

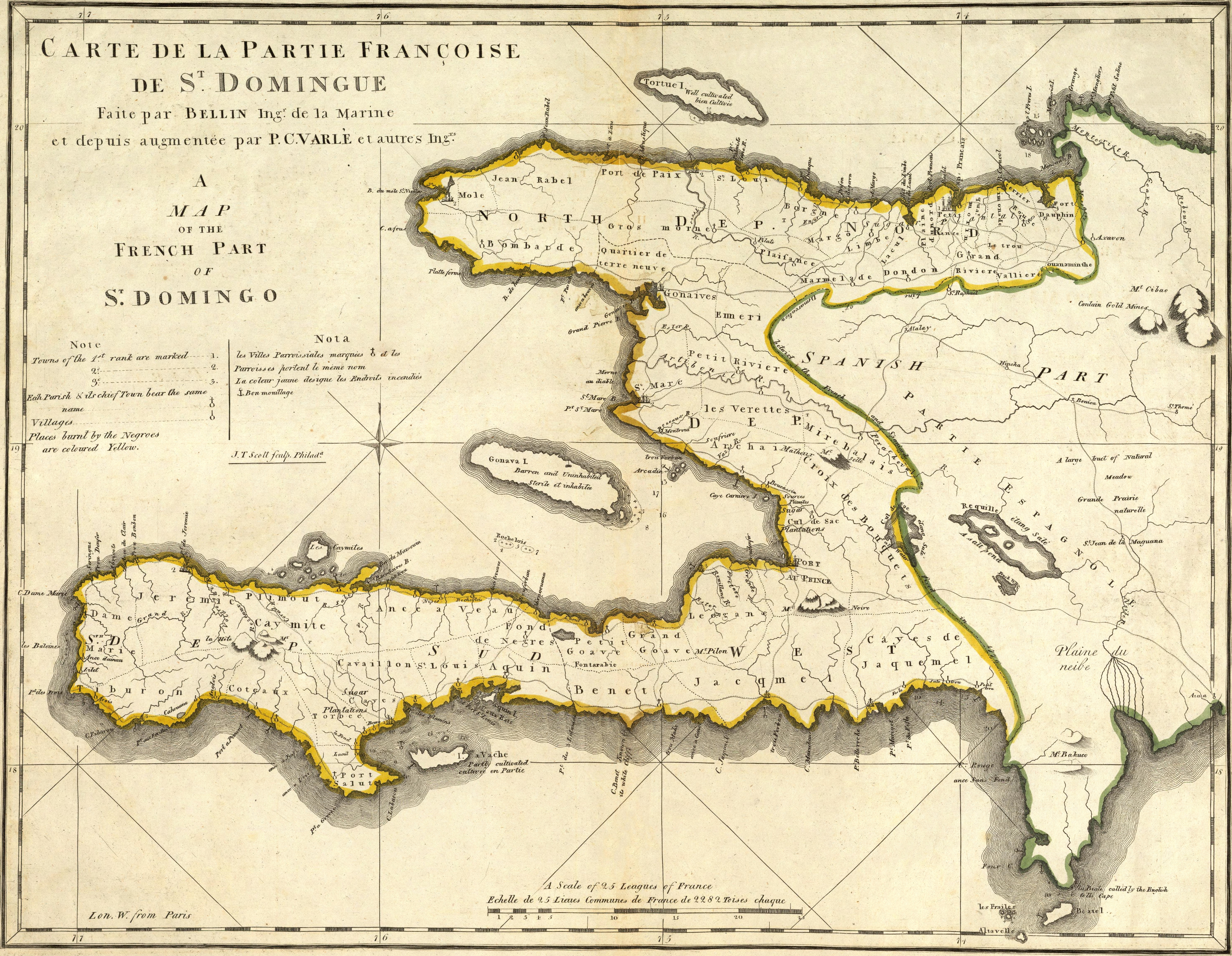
Map of the French part of Saint-Domingue

The Léopardins, also called the Assembly of Saint-Marc (Assemblée de Saint-Marc) or the “Faction des 85”, were the elected members of the self-proclaimed Assembly in Saint-Domingue (now Haiti) who tried to resist the reforms of the French Revolution, claiming to be above the Governor General. They sailed to France aboard the military ship Le Léopard to try to impose the Secession of Saint-Domingue there. The Léopardins were successors to the Club de Hôtel de Massiac, who were also worried about plans to give more freedoms to mulattoes or blacks.

== History ==
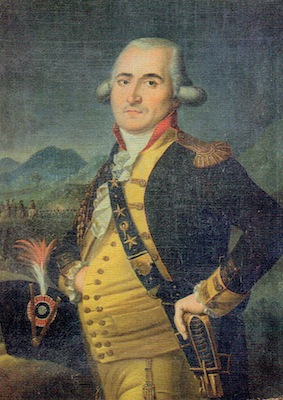
Philibert François Rouxel de Blanchelande, governor from 9 November 1790 to 1792

On 25 March 1790 and 15 April 1790, the elected deputies of the three provinces of North, West and South Saint-Domingue, were summoned to Saint-Marc (Haiti), under the chairmanship of Thomas Millet, to create a new "General Assembly of the French part of Saint-Dominge". The assembly of the west mainly answered the call, while that of the north preferred to remain "legalist" as the old and large families there preferred. The new "General Assembly of the French part of Saint-Domingue", known as "Saint-Marc", quickly made its main mission, in the minds of its electors, of preventing application of the decree of 15 May 1790, which had been prepared in France by the National Constituent Assembly, to grant people of color (mulattoes) equal political rights with whites. Thomas Millet, successively president then vice-president, proposed a motion that would force all whites who were married to a woman of color to take an African name.

On 28 May 1790 the "Assembly of Saint-Marc" published its own constitutional laws for the colony. The assembly then decided to open the ports of the colony to foreigners, which went against the laws of exclusive trade, still in force in the Kingdom. It let it be known that Saint-Domingue should be independent. Several bloody clashes then took place between supporters of this assembly, called "Red pompons", and the king's representatives, led by Governor Antoine de Thomassin de Peynier and Colonel Mauduit and named "White pompons", because of the white pins, which they attached to the pockets of their shirts.

On 30 June 1790, loyalist troops attacked the Western Assembly. Some sympathizers of the "red pompoms" tried to leave for France to assert their point of view with the revolutionaries. They were intercepted soon after they arrived in the port of Saint-Marc, and thrown in prison. On the night of 29–30 July 1790 Governor Antoine de Thomassin de Peynier dispersed the deputies of the "Saint-Marc Assembly".

A group of 85 elected members of the assembly seized the government ship Le Léopard on 7 August 1790, after having persuaded the crew to mutiny". They sailed for metropolitan France and Paris to assert the interests of the colonists of Saint-Domingue during the French Revolution.6 When the ship requisitioned by the "Léopardins" arrived in the harbor of Brest after having crossed the Ocean, the town council, impressed by the fact that almost all the elected representatives of the assembly were on board the ship, sent a delegation to meet them. In the process, they obtained financial support from a merchant in Dunkirk, in the form of a sum of 400,000 francs.

The national assembly agreed to hear them, but nevertheless decided on 12 October to dissolve the assembly of Saint-Marc.

The "Léopardins" included Thomas Millet, coffee planter, René-Ambroise Deaubonneau, deputy for Petit-Goâve in the Colonial Assembly, who was one of the founders of the so-called Assembly of Saint-Marc and the president of this assembly, Paul, François, Eustache, Marquis de Cadush and Colonel Jean-Jacques Bacon de la Chevalerie who was also president of the assembly, and had previously played a role in the development of Freemasonry.

== Timeline ==
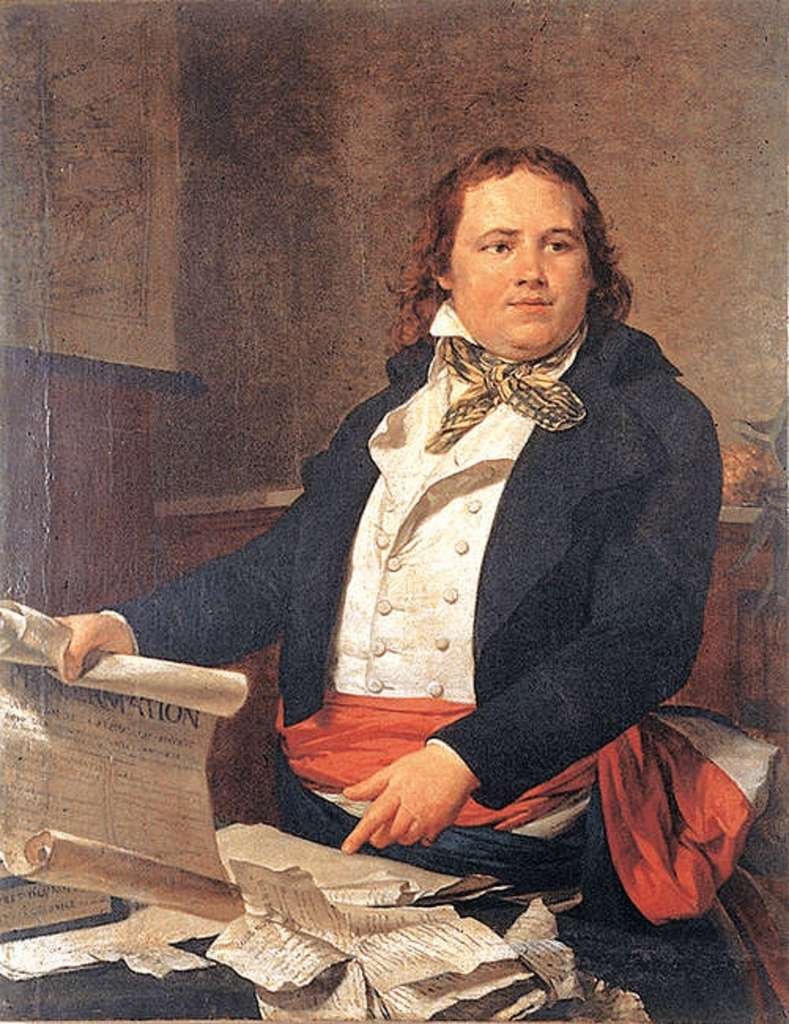
Léger-Félicité Sonthonax, Commissioner from 18 September 1792, Governor 2 January 1793 – 7 May 1793

- 1778: inter-racial marriages prohibited in metropolitan France
- 1784 December 3: royal ordinance for the improvement of the lot of slaves
- 1788 February 19: the Society of the Friends of the Blacks founded in Paris
- 1789
  - July 15: first assembly of "colonists residing in Paris" brought together by Louis-Marthe de Gouy d'Arsy
  - August 20: the Club de l'hôtel de Massiac founded in Paris.
  - July 26: arrival of a new governor Philibert François Rouxel de Blanchelande.
  - October 26: formation of a colonial assembly in the North.
- 1790
  - January 11: address of the Society of the Friends of the Blacks against the slave trade.
  - January 17: Jean-Jacques Bacon de la Chevalerie appointed captain-general of the national troops in Saint-Domingue.
  - February 27: three colonial assemblies of Santo Domingo exclusively composed of whites, are elected, for the south, the north and the west.
  - March 3: address of the Le Havre trades against the abolition of slavery.
  - March 28: decree in Paris opening representation without color discrimination (to the owners): the colonial assembly opposes its distribution, despite an amendment from Médéric Louis Élie Moreau de Saint-Méry leaving it a decision-making power, and claims autonomy.
  - March 25: an "Assembly of Saint-Marc" (future "Léopardins") meets.
  - April 14: the "Assembly of Saint-Marc" wants to replace the colonial assembly, considered too soft, by invoking orders from the king.
  - April: first emissaries sent by this "assembly of Saint-Marc" to Jamaica.
  - May 15: decree of the Parisian Constituent Assembly granting mulattoes equal political rights with Whites.
  - May 15: the "Assembly of Saint-Marc" votes "the constitutional bases of Saint-Domingue.
  - July 20: the "Assembly of Saint-Marc" opens the ports to foreign trade.
  - night of July 29 to July 30: the governor disperses the "Assembly of Saint-Marc".
  - August 7: revolt of the "Leopardins", also called "Faction des 85", that is to say the entire Assembly "of Saint Mark". They requisition the military ship "Leopard" to go to mainland France.
  - September 25: article of Léger-Félicité Sonthonax for the abolition.
  - October 12: the national assembly dissolves "the assembly of Saint-Marc".
  - October 23: Jacques-Vincent Ogé disembarks in Cape Town from an American ship, with munitions of war, it equips 250 to 300 men to demand the application of the decree. His arrival from Paris was denounced by the "Club de l'hôtel de Massiac".
  - October 29: Ogé and Jean-Baptiste Chavannes first beat M. de Vincens with 500 men, then were beaten by Colonel Cambefort with 1,500 men, refugees in the Spanish part, they are delivered to the governor Philibert François Rouxel de Blanchelande.
  - November 7: the northern colonial assembly accused of adding fuel to the fire by voting a text of mistrust towards black progressives.
  - November: Pierre Venant de Charmilly writes to William Pitt the Younger asking him to come to the aid of the colony.
- 1791
  - February 25: Ogé and Chavannes tortured until death ensued. The affair caused a stir and led the Constituent to re-examine the situation in May.
  - 14 August: In a meeting at Bois Caïman the slaves decide the revolt, led by Dutty Boukman, Jean-François Papillon and Georges Biassou.
  - August 24: the colonial assembly led by Paul de Cadush sends an emissary to Jamaica, and blocks boats bound for France, having chosen to request priority aid from England, considered less uncertain than Metropolitan France.
  - September 19: the new civil commissioners arrive, led by Ignace-Frédéric de Mirbeck.
  - September 24: decree in Paris, giving the Colonial Assembly the right to rule on the internal regime of the colony. The constituent assembly revokes the decree of 15 May 1790 which granted equality to mulattoes.
  - October 12: the civil commissioners dissolve the Colonial Assembly.
  - November 29: Ignace-Frédéric de Mirbeck officially civil commissioner in Saint-Domingue.
  - December 5: Ignace-Frédéric de Mirbeck announces a general amnesty. The black leaders propose peace against frankings.
- 1792
  - April 1:, Ignace-Frédéric de Mirbeck returns to France to ask for reinforcements
  - April 4: Paris grants full citizenship to all free people of color.
  - April 29: Léger-Félicité Sonthonax appointed as one of the three civil commissioners
  - August 10: capture of the Tuileries
  - August 10: Pierre Victor, baron Malouet and Pierre Venant de Charmilly go to England.
  - September: Paul de Cadush, generals Jean-Jacques d'Esparbes and Philippe de Montesquiou-Fézensac, dismissed by the civil commissioners Sonthonax and Polverel, arrive in Kingston, sometimes with their slaves.
  - December 12: Adam Williamson, governor of Jamaica, authorizes their landing in Jamaica.
- 1793
  - February, war on England and Spain following the execution of King Louis XVI
  - June 21: Léger-Félicité Sonthonax proclaims the freedom to all the slaves who would fight for the Republic.
  - September 3: Pierre Venant de Charmilly signs with Adam Williamson the "Capitulation of the Grande Anse"
- 1794
  - February 19: Treaty of Whitehall between the English and the settlers of Saint-Domingue

== Sources ==
- Ardouin, Beaubrun (1853), Étude sur l'histoire d'Haïti (in French), vol. 1, Dezobry et E. Magdeleine, Lib.
- Blancpain, François (2004), La colonie française de Saint-Domingue: de l'esclavage à l'indépendance, Collection Monde caribéen (in French), KARTHALA Editions, pp. 244 pages, ISBN 2845865902
- Cauna, Jacques de (1994), "La diaspora des colons de Saint-Domingue et le monde créole : le cas de la Jamaïque", Revue française d'histoire d'outre-mer (in French), 81 (304): 333–359, doi:10.3406/outre.1994.3230
- Dalmas, Antoine (1814), Histoire de la révolution de Saint-Domingue, suivie d'un mémoire sur le rétablissment de cette colonie (in French), vol. 1
- Destin, Lemarec (2011), La Ville de St-Marc HISTOIRE, ÉCONOMIE, POLITIQUE ET SOCIÉTÉ DES ORIGINES À 1971 (in French), ÉDITIONS DAMI MONTREAL
- Frostin, Charles (1962), "L'intervention britannique à Saint-Domingue en 1793", Revue française d'histoire d'outre-mer (in French), 49 (176): 293–365, doi:10.3406/outre.1962.1358
- Lara, Bruno D. (1991), "Le soulèvement de 1791 et ses conséquences dans la Méditerranée des Caraïbe", Consequences Inter Nationales de La Revolution Haitienne (in French), doi:10.7767/jbla.1991.28.1.199, S2CID 161972711
- Mirbeck, Ignace-Frédéric de (1792), Compte sommaire de l'état actuel de la colonie de Saint-Domingue (in French)
- Schoelcher, Victor (1982), Vie de Toussaint Louverture, KARTHALA Editions, pp. 455 pages, ISBN 9782865370436
- Yacou, Alain (2007), Saint-Domingue espagnol et la révolution nègre d'Haïti (1790-1822): commémoration du bicentenaire de la naissance de l'état d'Haïti (1804-2004) (in French), KARTHALA Editions, pp. 683 pages, ISBN 9782845868526
