= List of colonial governors of Saint-Domingue =

Since 1659, Saint-Domingue (now the Republic of Haiti), was a French colony, recognized by Spain on September 20, 1697. From September 20, 1793, to October 1798 parts of the island were under British occupation.

== Governors (1691–1714) ==
1. October 1, 1691 – July 1700 Jean du Casse
2. July 1700 – December 16, 1703 Joseph d'Honon de Gallifet (acting)
3. December 16, 1703 – October 13, 1705 Charles Auger
4. October 13, 1705 – December 28, 1707 Jean-Pierre de Charitte (acting)
5. December 28, 1707 – 1710 François-Joseph, comte de Choiseul-Beaupré
6. 1710 – February 7, 1711 Jean-Pierre de Charitte (2nd time)
7. February 7, 1711 – May 24, 1711 Laurent de Valernod
8. May 24, 1711 – August 29, 1712 Nicolas de Gabaret
9. August 29, 1712 – 1713 Paul-François de La Grange, comte d'Arquian
10. 1713 – 1714 Louis de Courbon, comte de Blénac

== Governors-General (1714–1803) ==
1. 1714 – 11 January 1717 Louis de Courbon, comte de Blénac
2. January 11, 1717 – July 10, 1719 Charles Joubert de La Bastide, marquis de Châteaumorand
3. 10 July 1719 – 6 December 1723 Léon de Sorel
4. December 6, 1723 – October 8, 1731 Gaspard-Charles de Goussé, chevalier de La Rochalar
5. October 8, 1731 – February 4, 1732 Antoine-Gabriel, marquis de Vienne de Busserolles
6. February 4, 1732 – October 8, 1732 Étienne Cochard de Chastenoye (acting)
7. October 8, 1732 – July 1737 Pierre, marquis de Fayet
8. July 1737 – November 11, 1737 Étienne Cochard de Chastenoye (2nd time) (acting)
9. November 11, 1737 – November, 1746 Charles de Brunier, marquis de Larnage
10. November 19, 1746 – August 12, 1748 Étienne Cochard de Chastenoye (3rd time) (acting)
11. August 12, 1748 – March 29, 1751 Hubert de Brienne-Conflans, comte de Conflans
12. March 29, 1751 – May 31, 1753 Emmanuel-Auguste de Cahideux du Bois de Lamothe
13. May 31 – March 24, 1757 Joseph-Hyacinthe de Rigaud, marquis de Vaudreuil
14. March 24, 1757 – July 30, 1762 Philippe-François Bart
15. July 30, 1762 – March 7, 1763 Gabriel de Bory de Saint-Vincent
16. March 7, 1763 – August 4, 1763 Armand, vicomte de Belzunce
17. August 4, 1763 – April 23, 1764 Pierre-André de Gohin, comte de Montreuil (acting)
18. April 23, 1764 – July 1, 1766 Charles Henri Hector d'Estaing
19. July 1, 1766 – February 10, 1769 Louis-Armand-Constantin de Rohan, prince de Montbazon
20. February 10, 1769 – January 15, 1772 Pierre Gédéon de Nolivos
21. January 15, 1772 – April 30, 1772 De la Ferronays (acting)
22. April 30, 1772 – April 15, 1775 Louis-Florent de Vallière
23. May 12, 1775 – August 16, 1775 Jean-François, comte de Reynaud de Villeverd (acting)
24. August 16, 1775 – December 13, 1776 Victor-Thérèse Charpentier
25. December 28, 1776 – May 22, 1777 Jean-Baptiste de Taste de Lilancour (acting)
26. May 22, 1777 – March 7, 1780 Robert, comte d'Argout
27. March 7, 1780 – April 25, 1780 Jean-Baptiste de Taste de Lilancour (2nd time) (acting)
28. April 25, 1780 – July 28, 1781 Jean-François, comte de Reynaud de Villeverd (2nd time)
29. July 28, 1781 – February 14, 1782 Jean-Baptiste de Taste de Lilancour (3rd time) (acting)
30. February 14, 1782 – July 3, 1785 Guillaume de Bellecombe
31. July 3, 1785 – April 27, 1786 Gui-Pierre de Coustard (acting)
32. April 27, 1786 – November 1787 César Henri, comte de La Luzerne
33. November 1787 – December 22, 1788 Alexandre de Vincent de Mazade (acting)
34. December 22, 1788 – 1789 Marie-Charles du Chilleau
35. 1789 – August 19, 1789 Alexandre de Vincent de Mazade (2nd time) (acting)
36. August 19, 1789 – November 1790 Antoine de Thomassin de Peynier
37. November 9, 1790 – 1792 Philibert François Rouxel de Blanchelande
38. 1792 – June 1792 Adrien-Nicolas, marquis de la Salle, comte d'Offémont
39. June 1792 – October 21, 1792 Jean-Jacques d'Esparbes
40. October 21, 1792 – January 2, 1793 Donatien-Marie-Joseph de Vimeur, vicomte de Rochambeau
41. January 2, 1793 – June 19, 1793 Léger-Félicité Sonthonax (commissioner)
42. June 19, 1793 – October 1793 François-Thomas Galbaud du Fort
43. October 1793 – May 11, 1796 Étienne Maynaud de Bizefranc de Laveaux
44. May 11, 1796 – August 24, 1797 Léger-Félicité Sonthonax (2nd time) (commissioner)
45. April 1, 1797 – May 6, 1802 Toussaint Louverture
46. March 27, 1798 – October 23, 1798 Gabriel-Marie-Théodore-Joseph Hédouville (commissioner)
47. February 5, 1802 – November 2, 1802 Charles Leclerc
48. November 2, 1802 – November 30, 1803 Donatien-Marie-Joseph de Vimeur, vicomte de Rochambeau (2nd time)
49. November 30, 1803 - December 31 1803 Jean-Jacques Dessalines (self proclaimed)

For continuation after independence, see: List of heads of state of Haiti

== British Governors (1793–1798) ==
1. September 20, 1793 – October 1794 John Whitelocke
2. October 1794 – October 1796 Adam Williamson
3. October 1796 – January 1797 John Graves Simcoe
4. January 1797 – March 1797 Colebrooke Nesbitt
5. March 1797 – October 1798 Thomas Maitland

== See also ==
- Saint-Domingue
- History of Haiti
