= Jean-Pierre de Charitte =

French colonial administrator (1648–1723)

Jean-Pierre de Casamajor de Charritte

Governor of Saint-Domingue (interim)
- In office 13 October 1705 – 28 December 1707
- Preceded by: Charles Auger
- Succeeded by: François-Joseph, comte de Choiseul-Beaupré

Governor of Saint-Domingue (interim)
- In office 24 May 1711 – 29 August 1712
- Preceded by: Laurent de Valernod
- Succeeded by: Paul-François de La Grange d'Arquien

Personal details
- Born: September 1648 Château de Charritte
- Died: 17 October 1723 (aged 75) Cap-Français, Saint Domingue
- Occupation: Naval officer, admimistrator

Jean-Pierre de Casamajor de Charritte (or Charitte, Charite; September 1648 – 17 October 1723 ) was a French colonial administrator who was interim governor of Saint-Domingue twice during the War of the Spanish Succession (1701–1714).

== Family ==
The Casamajor de Charritte was an old Basque-Béarnaise family. His great-grandfather Guicharnaud de Casamajor, a notary who became treasurer and receiver general of the Kingdom of Navarre, was ennobled in 1583 by Henry III of Navarre, who later became Henry IV of France. His grandfather Josué de Casamajor married Jeanne de Charritte in 1608. He was one of eight children of Isaac de Casamajor de Charritte and Marie de Maytie. Jean-Pierre de Casamajor de Charritte was born in the château de Charritte and baptized on 10 September 1648 in the Charritte parish church.

== Early career (1673–1705) ==
Charritte entered the Gardes de la Marine at the age of 25, and campaigned with them in Canada, on the coast of Africa and in the Leeward Islands. He became a ship-of-the-line ensign (enseigne de vaisseau) in January 1689, and after a long period at sea was promoted to lieutenant on 1 June 1693. The next year he was given command of the royal frigate Lutin with orders to cruise around the Île d'Yeu.

While in command of the Lutin he was ordered to escort a convoy of about 150 sail. It was attacked by a Dutch frigate from Vlissingen of 22 cannons and two Spanish corvettes of 10–12 cannons each. Three times through rapid and skillful maneuvers Charitte avoided being boarded. On the fourth attack, which was also repulsed, a shot from a falconet passed through Carritte's neck from side to side, and his shoulder and jaw were broken by fire from a musket. From that day, Charritte could only swallow liquid food. However, he had saved the convoy. News of the brilliant feat of arms was quickly taken to the French court at Versailles, where on 1 January 1697 King Louis XIV awarded Carritte a lifetime annual pension of 500 livres.

A few months later Charritte was named the king's lieutenant on the island of Saint Croix, and was given command of the Pressante, a frigate with 12 cannon and a crew of 50. First he was ordered to protect an important convoy of merchant vessels from La Rochelle to Bordeaux. Three ships flying foreign flags were seen on the first day of the voyage. Charitte dropped to the rear to deal with them. One was a frigate with 22 cannon and 100 men, and the other two were corvettes, one with 8 cannons and 70 men and the other with 6 cannon and sixty men. Charitte resisted the combined attack of the three corsairs, despite being greatly outnumbered, and put up a fierce fire when they made three attempts to close. They were repulsed each time, and eventually broke away. At the recommendation of Louis Phélypeaux, comte de Pontchartrain, Charitte was decorated with the Order of Saint Louis for this naval action. (Note: Communay, in the Revue de Gascogne: bulletin bimestrial de la Société historique de Gascogne (1889), gives accounts of two battles, one in the Lutin and the second in the Pressante. In both, he was escorting a convoy and was attacked by a 22-gun frigate and two corvettes. It seems possible that there was a single battle.)

In 1698 Charritte married Marie Louise de La Doubart de Beaumanoir. They had two sons. Charritte took up his post as the king's lieutenant on the island of Saint Croix. He was then appointed the king's lieutenant in Tortuga and Le Cap.

== Interim governor of Saint-Domingue (1705–1707) ==
Saint Domingue (Haiti)

Charles Auger, governor of Saint-Domingue, died in Léogâne on 13 October 1705. Charite took over as interim governor. In 1706, despite France and Spain being at war, the French and Spanish on Santo Domingo were coexisting peacefully. The minister wrote to Charitte telling him to stop the trade with the Spanish using small Dutch ships from Curaçao. The success of d'Iberville and Chavagnac in their raid on Saint Kitts and Nevis might cause the English to attack, and Charitte should take all measures needed to prepare to resist them. At this time Charitte was having difficulty dealing with disturbances in the colony that had followed the death of Auger. Charitte had an impetuous nature, and was involved in some commercial frauds, which resulted in complaints against him.

D'Iberville arrived at Léogane and found the buccaneers there willing to attack Jamaica, but died in Havana in July 1706 before being able to execute this plan. Chavitte limited himself with some measures to protect the coast of Saint-Domingue from English corsairs. He also encouraged the buccaneers to attack the English. In 1706 he entrusted the 20-year-old privateer Pierre Morpain with command of the Intrépide. (Note: While cruising on the New England coast in 1707 Morpain captured a slave ship and the merchant frigate Bonetta, which was loaded with food. He towed his prizes into Port-Royal harbor in Nova Scotia on 13 August 1707. The delivery of food was an important factor in letting the garrison hold out against an Anglo-American assault. The Intrépide left for Saint-Domingue on 20 September 1707, since Morpain wanted to sell his cargo of slaves.) He was later involved in a dispute with Pierre Morpain and his buccaneers when he seized a frigate captured by Morpain and resold it at a huge profit.

François-Joseph, comte de Choiseul-Beaupré was named governor on 1 August 1706, and was received by the council of Le Cap on 28 December 1707. Choiseuil fell out with the ordonnateur Jean-Jacques Mithon de Senneville over a decision over valuation of currencies then being used on the island, which had to be referred to the minister for resolution. He also quarreled with Charitte, who complained to the minister. Choiseuil probably would have been recalled if it were not for his relations at court.

== Interim governor of Saint-Domingue (1711–1712) ==
On 22 September 1710 Choisel was recalled and Laurent de Valernod was appointed interim governor. He was received at Le Cap on 7 February 1711. He died in Petit-Goâve on 24 May 1711, and Charite again became interim governor of Saint-Domingue. On 1 September 1711 Charite was named governor of Martinique. He refused the governorship of Martinique so he could oversee his plantations in Saint-Domingue. On 1 September 1711 Nicolas de Gabaret (1641–1712) was named governor of Saint-Domingue in place of Choiseul, but he did not take up the offer and died in Martinique on 25 June 1712. Then Paul-François de La Grange d'Arquien was named interim governor on 18 June 1712 and was received by the council of Le Cap on 29 August 1712. Charitte found himself unemployed.

In 1716 Charitte was made lieutenant to the governor general of Saint-Domingue, and held this position until his death. Charritte died on 17 October 1723 at the age of 75. Étienne Cochard de Chastenoye succeeded him as governor of Saint Croix and Le Cap. According to Médéric Louis Élie Moreau de Saint-Méry, Charritte was mild and popular, an enemy of despotism, but his character was marred by an insatiable cupidity.

== Sources ==
- Aspect (1780), Histoire de l'Ordre royal et militaire de St-Louis, Duchesne
- Communay, A. (1889), "Marins Basques & Béarnais", Revue de Gascogne: Bulletin bimestrial de la Société historique de Gascogne (in French), Société historique de Gascogne
- Coste, Philippe, "Jean-Pierre de Casamajor de Charritte", Geneanet (in French)
- Dessalles, Adrien (1847), Histoire générale des Antilles ..., Libraire-éditeur
- Jan, J.M. (1951), Les Congrégations religieuses à Saint-Domingue 1681-1793 (PDF) (in French), Port-au-Prince: Henri Deschamps
- Le Blant, Robert (1931), "Un Corsaire de Saint-Domingue en Acadie" (PDF), Nova Francia (in French)
- Moreau de Saint-Méry, Médéric Louis Elie (1785), Loix et constitutions des colonies franc̜oises de l'Amérique sous le vent: 1704-1721, Chez l'auteur
