= Court of Aids =

Financial courts in France (14th-18th centuries)

The Courts of Aids (French: Cours des aides) were sovereign courts in Ancien Régime France, primarily concerned with customs, but also other matters of public finance. They exercised some control over certain excise taxes and octroi duties, which were regarded as of a different nature from the taille, the gabelle, and the general imposts of the kingdom. The Paris court sat in the Palais-Vieux, of which a monumental door can still be seen in the Rue du Temple. It was set up to judge appeal-cases of extraordinary (i.e. fiscal) and ordinary (i.e. "domaniale") financial matters relating to the chambre du Trésor (treasury).

Guillaume de Lamoignon de Blancmesnil was "premier président" of the Paris Court of Aids from 1746 to 1749. Guillaume-Chrétien de Lamoignon de Malesherbes, his son, succeeded him and served from 1750 to 1775. (According to an etching from 1655, Jacques Amelot was the "premier président" of the Cour des Aydes or, in English, Court of Aids. See the Metropolitan Museum of Art Gallery Images for his portrait of 1655 and its inscription.)
