= Joseph de Bouloc =

French governor of Grenada (1660-1708/9)

Joseph de Bouloc (1660 – 2 December 1708/9) was the French governor of Grenada from January 1701 until 1708.

== Biography ==
De Bouloc was originally from Toulouse and was made a reformed Lieutenant-Colonel of the Musketeers of the Guard (known as the Artagnan Regiment). Then in 1699 he was made Lieutenant of the King at Port-de-Paix, Haiti (Colony of Saint Domingue) and then at the Île-à-Vache. He was made governor of Grenada in 1701 and was given the order of Saint Louis in 1707. He was succeeded as governor by Laurent de Valernod.
