= Étienne Cochard de Chastenoye =

French colonial soldier

Governor of Saint-Domingue (interim)
- In office 4 February 1732 – 27 October 1732
- Preceded by: Antoine-Gabriel, marquis de Vienne de Busserolles
- Succeeded by: Pierre, marquis de Fayet

Governor of Saint-Domingue (interim)
- In office 11 July 1737 – 11 November 1737
- Preceded by: Pierre, marquis de Fayet
- Succeeded by: Charles Brunier, marquis de Larnage

Governor of Saint-Domingue (interim)
- In office 17 November 1746 – 12 August 1748
- Preceded by: Charles de Brunier, marquis de Larnage
- Succeeded by: Joseph-Hyacinthe de Rigaud, marquis de Vaudreuil

Personal details
- Died: c. 1749
- Occupation: Soldier

Étienne Cochard de Chastenoye (died c. 1749) was a French colonial soldier who was interim governor of Saint-Domingue (Haiti) three times in the 18th century.

== Early career ==
Étienne Cochard de Chastenoye came to Saint-Domingue in 1697, and served without interruption until 1749. (Note: Another source says he was a lieutenant in Saint-Domingue in 1695. There may have been a delay between his appointment and his arrival.) He was a major in Léogâne in 1713 and in Le Cap (Cap-Haïtien) in 1714. He was the king's lieutenant in Le Cap in 1717. In 1720 he was made a knight of the Order of Saint Louis. In 1723 Chastenoye succeeded Jean-Pierre de Charitte as governor of Saint Croix and Le Cap. Chastenoye and his son were both governors of La Cap and lieutenants to the governor general of Saint-Domingue, and both lived in Le Cap. His son was Achille de Cochard de Chastenoye, Marquis de Chastenoye. (Note: In March 1750 Anne-Charlotte le Tonnellier de Breteuil (10 January 1748 – 31 July 1799) married Achilles de Cochart (died 10 April 1787 in Paris), marquis de Chastenoye, knight of the Order of Saint Louis, Governor of Tortuga, Le Cap and the north part of Saint-Domingue, lieutenant general of the government of the Leeward Islands.)

== Interim governor general ==
Antoine Gabriel de Vienne de Busserrolles, Governor-General of Saint-Domingue, died at Fort-Dauphin (Fort-Liberté) on 4 February 1732. Etienne de Chastenoye served as interim governor from 4 February 1732 to 27 October 1732. The new governor, Pierre, marquis de Fayet was received on 27 October 1732. In 1737 Chastenoye was appointed lieutenant to the Governor General of Saint-Domingue en 1737. Fayet died in Petit-Goâve on 11 March 1737. Chastenoye was again interim governor from 11 July 1737 to 11 November 1737. Charles Brunier, Marquis de Larnage, was received on 11 November 1737. He died at Petit-Goâve on 19 November 1746.

Chastenoye was interim governor for the third time between 17 November 1746 and 12 August 1748. In 1747 there were increasingly poor relations between France and the States-General of the Netherlands. Charles de Tubières de Caylus arrested the Dutch traders at Martinique, and Chastonoye reluctantly followed suit. This was a problem to the colonists, who depended on the Dutch for many of their supplies. It was partly solved by Dutch traders who now claimed to be Danish, and thus eligible to trade.

On 22 March 1748 a squadron of British ships under Admiral Charles Knowles entered the harbor of Port Saint Louis, which was guarded by an island castle with 24 feet (7.3 m) high stone walls, 78 guns, 310 troops and a company of black gunners. In the Battle of Saint-Louis-du-Sud, the British ships anchored under the ramparts and fired steadily for three hours, causing 160 casualties to the garrison. Chastenoye, who was commanding the fort, sued for terms. The British seized four ships, blew up the fort and left on 30 March 1748.

The Treaty of Aix-la-Chapelle of 24 April 1748 ended the War of the Austrian Succession. Chastenoye was succeeded on 12 August 1748 by Joseph-Hyacinthe de Rigaud, marquis de Vaudreuil. On 17 January 1749 Chastenoye wrote to the minister Jean-Frédéric Phélypeaux, Count of Maurepas pointing out the commercial losses of the planters during the recent war and the expense of supplying blacks to work on the defenses, and calling for protection for their trade. His son, Achille Cochart, marquis de Chastenoye, was appointed governor of La Cap on 1 November 1749.

According to Médéric Louis Élie Moreau de Saint-Méry, Chatenoye earned the respect of the officers and the confidence of the settlers everywhere in the course of his long career.

== Sources ==
- Base collaborative Pierfit, "Etienne COCHARD Cochard de Chastenoye", Geneanet (in French)
- "Cochard de Chastenoye, Etienne", ANOM: Archives nationales d'outre-mer (in French)
- Dessalles, Adrien (1848), Histoire politique et commerciale des Antilles ..., France
- Jan, J.M. (1951), Les Congrégations religieuses à Saint-Domingue 1681-1793 (PDF) (in French), Port-au-Prince: Henri Deschamps
- Marley, David F. (2008), Wars of the Americas: A Chronology of Armed Conflict in the Western Hemisphere, 1492 to the Present, ABC-CLIO, ISBN 978-1-59884-100-8
- Moreau de Saint Mery, Mederic Louis Elie (1797), Description topographique, physique, civile, politique et historique de la partie francaise de l'isle Saint Domingue (etc.), Paris, chez Dupont, libraire; Hambourg, chez les principaux libraires
- Pares, Richard (12 October 2012), War and Trade in the West Indies, Routledge, ISBN 978-1-136-25905-0
- Saint Allais, Nicolas Viton de (1818), Nobiliare universel de France, ou recueil général des généalogies historiques des maisons nobles de ce royaume (in French)
- Vaissière, Pierre de (April 1906), "Les origines de la colonisation et la formation de la société française à Saint-Domingue" (PDF), Revue des questions historiques (in French), Paris: bibliothèque numérique Manioc
