= Laurent de Valernod =

Governor of Grenada (1708–1710)

Governor of Grenada
- In office 1708–1710
- Preceded by: Joseph de Bouloc
- Succeeded by: Guillaume-Emmanuel-Théodore de Maupeou

Governor of Saint-Domingue
- In office 7 February 1711, but died in Petit-Goâve on – 24 May 1711
- Preceded by: François-Joseph, comte de Choiseul-Beaupré
- Succeeded by: Jean-Pierre de Charite

Personal details
- Born: 1669
- Died: 24 May 1711 (aged 41–42) Petit-Goâve, Saint-Domingue
- Occupation: Colonial administrator

Laurent de Valernod (1669 – 24 May 1711) was a French colonial administrator who was governor of Grenada from 1708 to 1710, then governor of Saint-Domingue until his death in 1711.

== Career ==
Laurent de Valernod was a gentleman of Dauphiné. He was the son of Hugues de Valernod, seigneur de Fay and Anne de Mistral (1633–1687). He was baptized on 21 August 1669 at Saint-Vallier, Drôme, France. Laurent de Valernod joined the army and became a captain of the grenadiers. He became a knight to the Order of Saint Louis.

== Governor of Grenada ==
In 1709 Valernod replaced M. de Bouloc, Governor of Grenada, who had died in 1708. Valernod was taken from the regiment of Navarre to command in Grenada. The island was subordinate to Martinique at this time. He left office in 1710 and was replaced by the Chevalier de Maupeou-Ribaudon (died 1725), a naval officer.

== Governor of Saint-Domingue ==
On 22 September 1710 the king gave Valernod command of Tortuga and the coast of Saint-Domingue. A letter of 23 September 1710 told François-Joseph, comte de Choiseul-Beaupré that the king had relieved him of his duties as governor of Saint-Domingue. Also on 23 September 1710 the Secrétariat d'État à la Marine wrote to Valernod informing him of his appointment as governor of Saint-Domingue in place of Choiseul, and wrote to the intendant Jean-Jacques Mithon de Senneville on the same subject. Letters of 24 December 1710 discussed the reorganization of the administration of Saint-Domingue, cooperation with Mithon, administration of justice and the plans by the engineer Cauvet for fortifications at Petit-Goave. A letter of 6 February 1711 discussed road maintenance, buccaneers, discipline of the Negros and other subjects.

Valernod was received at Le Cap on 7 February 1711 and by the council of Petit-Goâve on 5 May 1711. Valernod and Mithon issued an ordinance on 1 May 1711 requiring all the settlers to report the number of blacks and mulattoes that were working for them, on pain of having undeclared negros confiscated. Valernod died in Petit-Goâve on 24 May 1711. Jean-Pierre de Charitte took over as interim governor.

== Sources ==
- Bâtie, Gustave de Rivoire de La (1867), Armorial du Dauphiné, Perrin
- Champel, Thierry, "Laurent de Valernod", Geneanet (in French)
- Durret (1720), Voyage de Marseille a Lima et dans les autres lieux des Indes Occidentales (etc.) (in French), Jean-Baptiste Coignard
- Moreau de Saint-Méry, Médéric Louis Elie (1785), Loix et constitutions des colonies franc̜oises de l'Amérique sous le vent: 1704-1721, Chez l'auteur
- Pritchard, James S. (22 January 2004), In Search of Empire: The French in the Americas, 1670-1730, Cambridge University Press, ISBN 978-0-521-82742-3
- Secrétariat d'État à la Marine (1710–1711), Valernod (Laurent de) (in French), ANOM: Archives nationales d'outre-mer
- Taillemite, Etienne, Choiseul-Beaupré (François Joseph, comte de) (in French), Archives nationales d'outre-mer
