= Paul-François de La Grange d'Arquien =

French naval officer and colonial administrator

Governor of Saint-Domingue (interim)
- In office 29 August 1712 – 13 June 1713
- Preceded by: Nicolas de Gabaret
- Succeeded by: Louis de Courbon, comte de Blénac

Personal details
- Born: c. 1670
- Died: 4 May 1745
- Occupation: Naval officer

Paul-François de La Grange, comte d'Arquien (or Arquian, Arquyan; c. 1670 – 4 May 1745) was a French naval officer and colonial administrator. He was interim governor of Saint-Domingue (now Haiti) in 1712–1713.

== Family ==
Paul-François de La Grange, Comte d'Arguien, was the oldest son of Antoine de la Grange, Comte d'Arguien, vicomte de Soulangis, first chamberlain of Philippe I, Duke of Orléans, and of Louise Charpemtier. His grandfather was Jean-Jacques de la Grange, older brother of Henri Albert de La Grange d'Arquien, who was father of Marie Casimire Louise de La Grange d'Arquien (1641-1716). Marie Casimire became queen of Poland He married Lucrece Jouffelin-Melforts (died 26 July 1717 aged 42), first lady of honor of Marie Casimire Louise de La Grange, on 12 April 1706. They had three sons and a daughter.

== Career ==
Arquien became a knight of the Order of Saint Louis, ship-of-the-line captain (capitaine de vaisseau) and the king's lieutenant in the government of Aunis. In October 1711 he was commander of the island of Grenada. Arquien was named governor of the island of Sainte Croix on 1 September 1711 in place of M. de Charite, and was commander in chief of Tortuga, Cap François (now Cap-Haïtien) and the coasts of Saint-Domingue. On 29 June 1712 he was named interim governor of Saint-Domingue. He was received by the Council of Cap François on 29 August 1712. That month he received word from France that a treaty had been signed that ended hostilities between France and England. On 13 March 1713 he issued an ordinance forbidding the purchase of wood from blacks and the sale of eau de vie to blacks.

Louis de Courbon, comte de Blénac was named governor of Saint-Domingue in place of Nicolas de Gabaret on 1 October 1712, and was received by the Council of Cap François on 13 June 1713. Arguyan resumed his post at the Cap-Français, which he commanded as Governor of Sainte-Croix. Arguyan has issued an inexplicable ordinance under which the inhabitants required his written permission to sell their houses. Blénac promptly cancelled this order. La Cap was the main town and capital of the colony at the time, but the church was wooden and poorly built. On 28 March 1715 Arquien laid the first stone of a new church, and by 22 December 1718 the new masonry building was consecrated. He was still Governor of Le Cap in November 1722.

== Sources ==
- Dessalles, Adrien (1847), Histoire générale des Antilles ..., Libraire-éditeur
- Margat (1819), Lettres édifiantes et curieuses, écrites des missions étrangères, J. Vernarel
- Moreau de Saint-Méry, Médéric Louis Elie (1785), Loix et constitutions des colonies franc̜oises de l'Amérique sous le vent: 1704-1721, Chez l'auteur
- Sainte-Marie, Anselme de (1733), Histoire généalogique et chronologique de la Maison Royale de France, des pairs, des grands officiers de la Couronne & de la Maison du Roy : & des anciens barons du Royaume (3 ed.), par la compagnie des libraires associez
