= Charles Joubert de La Bastide =

French naval officer

Lieutenant General Joseph Joubert Charles La Bastide

Governor of Saint-Domingue
- In office January 11, 1717 – July 10, 1719
- Preceded by: Louis de Courbon, comte de Blénac
- Succeeded by: Léon de Sorel

Personal details
- Died: June 3, 1722 Paris, France
- Awards: Order of Our Lady of Mount Carmel; Order of Saint Louis

Military service
- Allegiance: France
- Branch/service: French Navy
- Years of service: 1672-1722
- Rank: Lieutenant General (Vice Admiral)
- Battles/wars: War of the League of Augsburg

Joseph Joubert Charles La Bastide, knight and marquis of Chateaumorand (or Château-Morand), was a naval officer and colonial administrator French in the seventeenth and eighteenth centuries. He was a governor of Saint-Domingue between January 11, 1717, and July 10, 1719, and Lieutenant-General of the Naval Armies (1 November 1720). He was a Knight of St. Louis, and Knight of the Royal Order of Our Lady of Mount Carmel and Saint Lazarus of Jerusalem.

== Biography ==
He was the son of Annet Joubert La Bastide, Conde Chateaumorand († 1699) and Francoise de Costentin Tourville, sister of Marshal de Tourville. Among his siblings, two are distinguished in the service of the armies of the king of France: Francis Annet Joubert de la Bastide, Marquis of Chateaumorand, and captain, and Jean Francois Joubert La Bastide, Marquis of Chateaumorand, Lieutenant General of the armies of King and head of St. Louis.

Neveu de Tourville, entered the Navy as part of his uncle in 1672, working with his uncle in all his campaigns. He participated in the War of the League of Augsburg and especially on May 29, 1692, at the Battle of La Hogue.

He was named a Knight in St. Louis by the King in 1693, in the first promoción. The following year, he occupies Toulon. In 1699, after the death of his brother greater, Francis Annet, he became the second Marquis of Chateaumorand.

D'Iberville returned to France in 1697, where he was selected by the Ministry of the Navy at the head of an expedition to rediscover the mouth of the Mississippi and Louisiana to colonize the coveted British. Chateau-Morand is responsible for the escort.

The French fleet sailed from Brest October 24, 1698. After three months at sea, they reach the island of Santa Rosa's face, in Pensacola, Florida, January 25, 1699, a Spanish city. D'Iberville abandoned to Mobile Bay, and he started exploring Massacre Island, later renamed Dauphin Island. He stops between Cat Island and Ship Island on February 13, 1699, and continued his explorations to the mainland, in Biloxi, with his brother Jean-Baptiste Le Moyne de Bienville. On April 20, Castle-Morand, who had only come to escort Iberville, took his boat the way of Europe.

In 1702, he became the captain. In the spring of 1704, addressed towards the Strait of Gibraltar. On 24 August the same year, in the naval Battle of Vélez-Málaga, he commanded the Perfect, 74-gun ship in the battle group led by the Comte de Toulouse, admiral of France.

In 1705, his salary was raised to 2400 pounds per year. He was promoted to the rank of admiral in 1712. He succeeds Charles Courbon as governor of Saint Domingue from the January 28, 1716, to July 1718. He was replaced on September 1, 1718, by M. Sorel. He rose to the rank of lieutenant-general of the naval forces in 1720.

He died in Paris on died June 3, 1722.
