= Mont, Pyrénées-Atlantiques =

Mont
- Commune
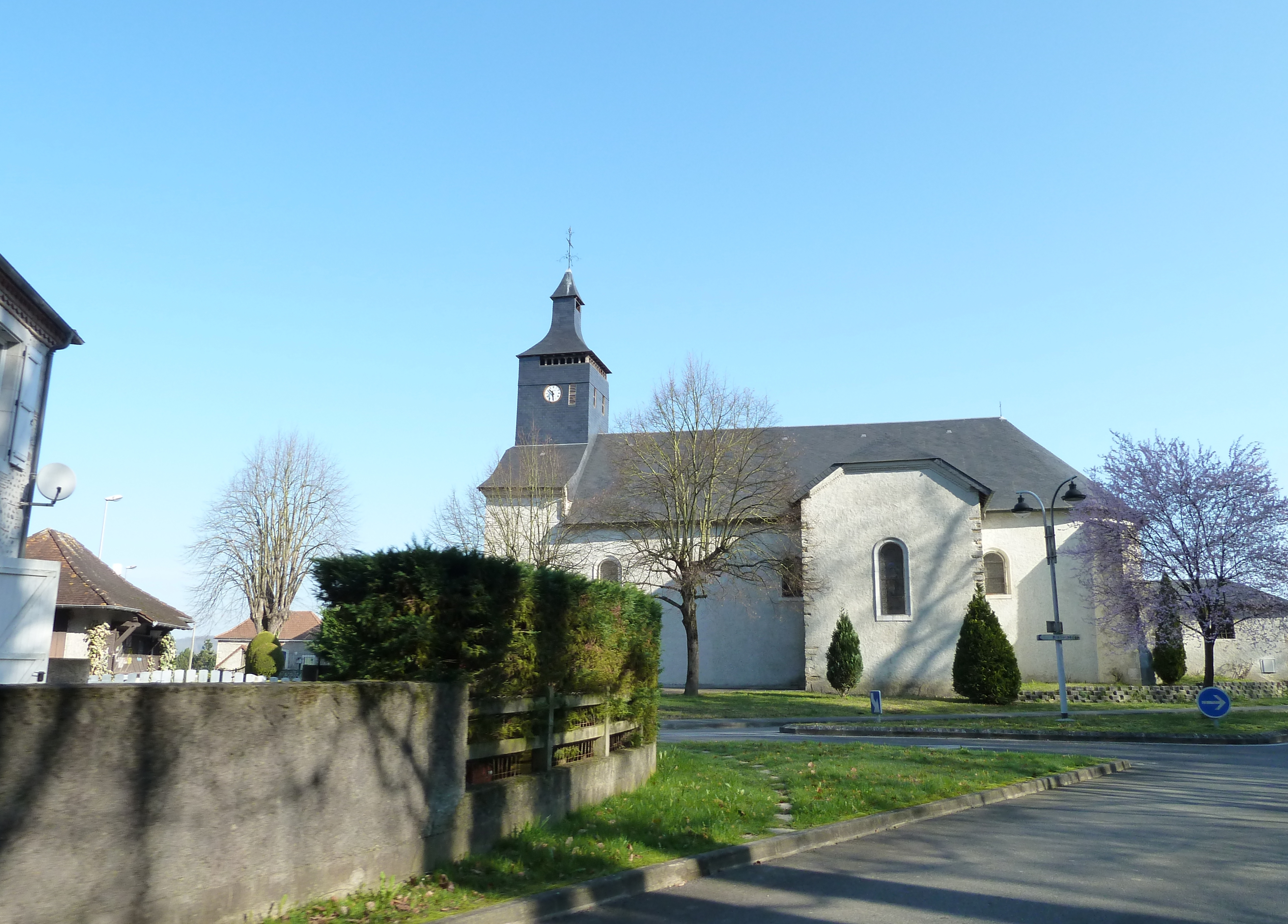
- The church of Mont
- Location of Mont
- Location within France Location within Nouvelle-Aquitaine
- Coordinates: 43°26′09″N 0°39′07″W
- Country: France
- Region: Nouvelle-Aquitaine
- Department: Pyrénées-Atlantiques
- Arrondissement: Pau
- Canton: Artix et Pays de Soubestre
- Intercommunality: Lacq-Orthez

Government
  - Mayor (2020–2026): Jacques Clavé
- Area^{1}: 18.24 km^{2} (7.04 sq mi)
- Elevation: 110 m (360 ft)
- Highest elevation: 202 m (663 ft)
- Lowest elevation: 69 m (226 ft)
- Population (2023): 1,146
  - Density: 62.83/km^{2} (162.7/sq mi)
- Time zone: UTC+01:00 (CET)
  - Summer (DST): UTC+02:00 (CEST)
- INSEE/Postal code: 64396 /64300
- ^{1} French Land Register data, which excludes lakes, ponds, glaciers > 1 km^{2} (0.386 sq mi or 247 acres) and river estuaries.

Mont (French pronunciation: [mɔ̃]; Occitan: Montanha) is a commune in the Pyrénées-Atlantiques department in south-western France.

== See also ==
- Communes of the Pyrénées-Atlantiques department
