= Guillaume-Chrétien de Lamoignon de Malesherbes =

French statesman and minister (1721–1794)

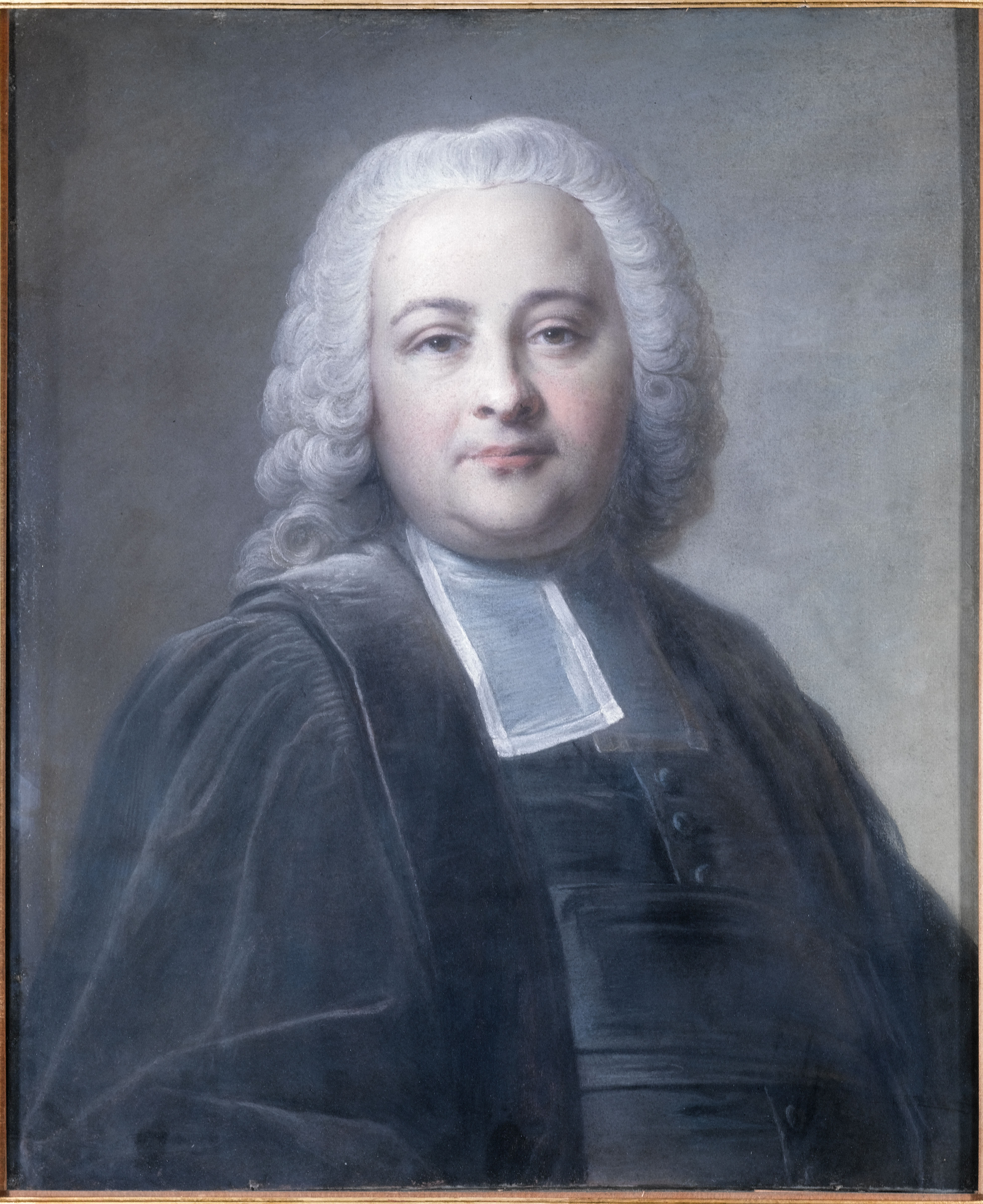
- (Musée de la Révolution française)

Secretary of State of the Maison du Roi
- In office 20 July 1775 – 12 May 1776
- Preceded by: The Duke of La Vrillière
- Succeeded by: Antoine-Jean Amelot de Chaillou

President of the Cour des aides
- In office 1750–1775

Personal details
- Born: 6 December 1721 Paris, Kingdom of France
- Died: 22 April 1794 (aged 72) Paris, French Republic
- Spouse(s): Françoise Thérèse Grimod de la Reynière, (m. 1749-1771)
- Profession: Statesman, politician, Counsel

Guillaume-Chrétien de Lamoignon de Malesherbes (French pronunciation: [ɡijom kʁetjɛ̃ də lamwaɲɔ̃ də malzɛʁb], 6 December 1721 – 22 April 1794), often referred to as Malesherbes or Lamoignon-Malesherbes, was a French statesman and minister in the Ancien Régime, and later counsel for the defense of Louis XVI. He is known for his vigorous criticism of royal abuses as President of the Cour des aides and his role, as director of censorship, in helping with the publication of the Encyclopédie. Despite his committed monarchism, his writings contributed to the development of liberalism during the French Age of Enlightenment.

== Biography ==
=== Family and early career ===
Born in Paris to a famous legal family which belonged to the noblesse de robe, Malesherbes was educated for the legal profession. The young lawyer's career received a boost when his father, Guillaume de Lamoignon de Blancmesnil, was appointed Chancellor in 1750; he appointed his son Malesherbes as both President of the Cour des Aides and Director of the Librairie. This latter office entailed supervision of all French censorship, and in this capacity Malesherbes maintained communication with the literary leaders of Paris, including Diderot and Rousseau. In his view toward censorship, Malesherbes ordered that genuinely "obscene" books be confiscated, but that merely "licentious" ones should be ignored. This was done in the belief that without such a distinction, police might find themselves taking possession of the better part of many shopkeepers' inventories. He was instrumental in the publication of the Encyclopédie, to the consternation of the Church and particularly the Jesuits.

=== Late wife ===
Françoise Thérèse Grimod de la Reynière, born around 1732 to her father Jean Antoine Gaspard GRIMOD de la REYNIÈRE (1687-1754) and her mother Marie Madeleine MAZADE (1716-1773), she married Malesherbes on the 4th of February 1749, (Aged 17 whilst he was 27-28). She took her own life on 11th of January, 1771, aged 39-40.

He is never documented to remarry.

=== Midlife ===
In 1771, following the dismissal of Choiseul late the preceding year and at the instigation of Madame du Barry and the duc d'Aiguillon, the Cour des Aides was dissolved for its opposition to a new method of administering justice devised by Maupeou, who planned to greatly diminish its powers and those of the parlements in general. Malesherbes, as President of the cour des aides, criticized the proposal for over-centralizing the justice system and abolishing the hereditary "nobility of the robe," which he believed had been a defender of the people and a check on royal power due to its independence. He published a strong remonstrance against the new system, and was banished to his country seat at Malesherbes. For the next three years, Malesherbes dedicated himself primarily to travel and gardening. Indeed, he had always been an enthusiastic botanist; his avenue at Malesherbes was world-famous; he had written against Buffon and in favor of Carl Linnaeus' system of botanical classification; and he had been a member of the Académie des sciences since 1750.

=== The 1775 Remontrances ===
Malesherbes was recalled to Paris with the reconstituted cour des aides on the accession of Louis XVI; it was at this point that he spearheaded the famous 1775 Remontrances of the cour des aides, which detailed the problems facing the regime and envisioned a total overhaul of fiscal policy. Louis XVI was so impressed with the plan—and fearful for the future of his government—that Malesherbes was appointed minister of the maison du roi in 1775. During the same year, Malesherbes was also elected to the Académie française. He held office as a royal minister only nine months; the Court proved intransigent in its opposition to his proposals for fiscal restraint and other reforms, including curtailing the arbitrary issuance of lettres de cachet, and he soon found himself bereft of political support.

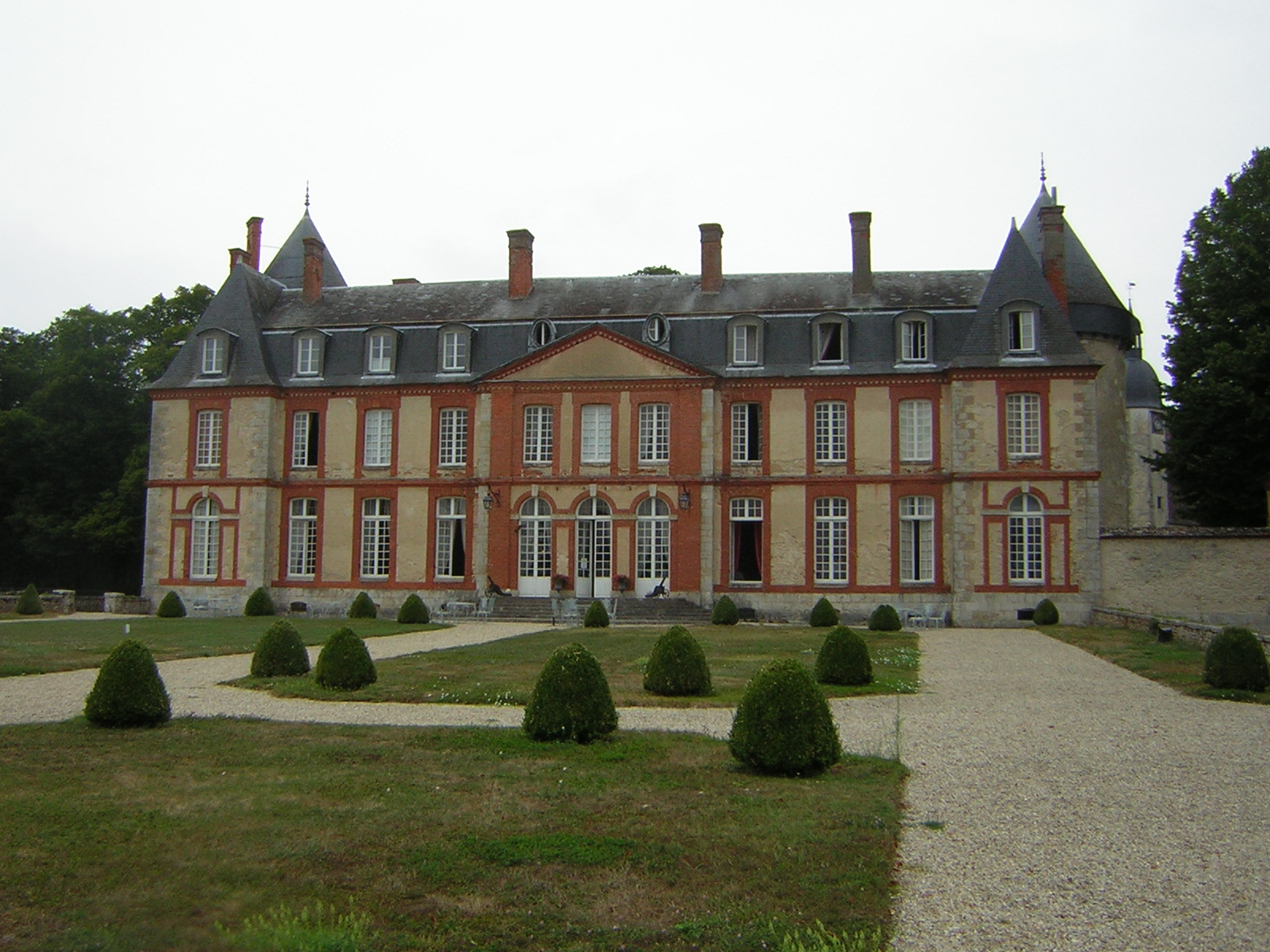
Château of Malesherbes

=== Late career ===
On retiring from the ministry with Turgot in 1776, he again spent some time at his country seat. But the state of pre-Revolutionary France made it impossible for Malesherbes to withdraw from political life. In 1787, he authored an essay on Protestant rights that did much to procure civil recognition for them in France; later that year, his Mémoire to the King detailed what he saw as the catastrophic state of affairs created by the monarchy, which was rapidly making "future calamities" inevitable.

=== Retirement ===
In 1788, rioting rocked France in Provence, Languedoc, Rousillon, Béarn, Flanders, Franche-Comté and Burgundy, most of the rioters motivated either by scarcity of bread, sympathy for representative government, or a combination. Due to the pressure, Lamoignon retired on 14 September 1788, and rioting erupted again. Crowds tried to burn down Lamoignon's house, the troops were called out, and to quote the anarchist Peter Kropotkin, "there was a horrible slaughter of poor folk who could not defend themselves."

=== Trial of the King; execution ===
In December 1792, with the King imprisoned and facing trial, Malesherbes volunteered to undertake his legal defense. He argued for the King's life, together with François Tronchet and Raymond Desèze, before the Convention, and it was his painful task to break the news of his condemnation to the king.

After this effort, Malesherbes returned once more to the country, but in December 1793 he was arrested with his daughter, his son-in-law M. de Rosanbo, and his grandchildren. He was brought back to Paris and imprisoned with his family for "conspiracy with the emigrants". The family was imprisoned in the Prison Portes-Libres, and in April 1794 they were guillotined in Paris. His son-in-law, Louis Le Peletier de Rosanbo, was guillotined on 20 April 1794. On 22 April 1794, his daughter Antoinette, granddaughter Aline and her husband Jean-Baptiste de Chateaubriand, the deputés Isaac René Guy le Chapelier and Jacques Guillaume Thouret, four times elected president of the Constituent Assembly, were executed with him. As Malesherbes left prison to get into the tumbrel, his foot hit a stone, causing him to stumble. "That," he said, smiling sadly, "is a bad omen; in my place, a Roman would have turned back."

On 10 May, his older sister Anne-Nicole, Countess of Sénozan, 76, was executed on the same day as Madame Elisabeth, the king's sister. Malesherbes was the grandfather of François-René de Chateaubriand's sister in law, Aline de Chateaubriand.

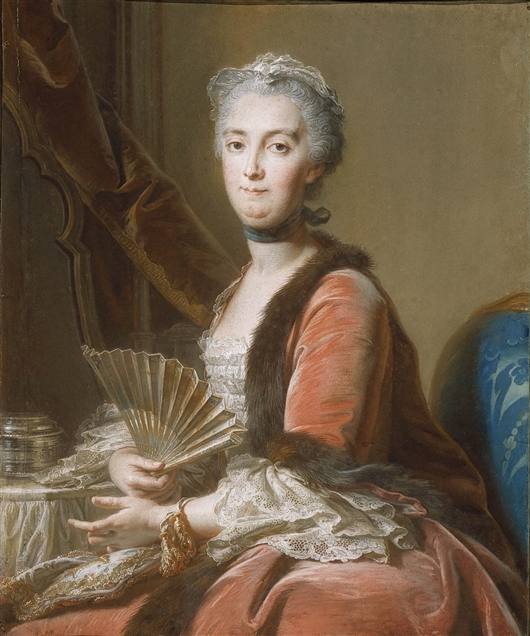
Anne-Marie, Countess of Sénozan

== Thought ==
Although he remained a committed royalist until his death, Malesherbes was hardly untouched by the radical Enlightenment currents that transformed France. He was influenced by his reading of Fénelon and Montesquieu and his friendships with Rousseau and Turgot. On multiple occasions throughout his career, he recognized the grievances later cited by revolutionaries when he criticized the monarchy for its unfair and arbitrary taxation policies and profligate spending. Although he believed hierarchy was natural and desirable, he was concerned about its distortionary effects on administration and justice; indeed, he argued that the privileges of the nobility should be earned through service to France, not granted by birth. Malesherbes also stressed the importance of communication in governing, believing the King should be more engaged with public opinion and grievances.

Malesherbes' moderate and reformist tendencies were on full display during his tenure at the Librairie. When he retired from his post, Voltaire wrote that "M. de Malesherbes tirelessly served the human spirit by giving to the press more liberty than it has ever had." Indeed, censorship at the time was not perceived as automatically inimical to the Enlightenment; several leading philosophes were employed as censors, including Diderot and d'Alembert. Although he believed that books attacking governmental authority and religion should be suppressed, Malesherbes also frequently overruled censors to permit the publication of philosophical works that had been flagged as dangerous. In one notable case, Malesherbes granted royal privilege, meaning official sanction and exclusive publication rights, to a radical work by Helvétius that caused a public scandal upon its release. The Court eventually revoked the royal privilege and the Parliament ordered the book to be burned. On another occasion, when he was impressed with Rousseau's Emile, or On Education, Malesherbes worked around his own agency to coordinate the clandestine publication of the book.

Malesherbes applied his broader criticisms of government inefficiency and privilege to the practice of censorship, as well. He defended his more permissive censorship regime by arguing that banning too many books would stifle the book trade and make enforcement unfeasible. Furthermore, he broke with Librairie tradition by refusing to grant favors to nobles who requested that a particular book be either published or blocked.

Decades after his retirement from the Librairie, in 1788, Malesherbes published his Mémoires sur la Liberté de la Presse, where he critiqued the system of censorship he had been charged with enforcing. On the eve of the French Revolution, he defended freedom of the press on the grounds of encouraging public debate: under a censorship regime, only the most extreme authors would take the risk of publishing on sensitive topics, and the public would be deprived of the views of the "modest and reasonable Authors" who "would be the most useful to the public." Indeed, Malesherbes now adopted the Revolutionary language of the "nation," and argued that the nation can only come to know the truth through free discussion, which is more effective than censorship at preventing the spread of "error." He had not discarded the concept of censorship, however; instead, he envisaged a voluntary censorship scheme, which would guarantee authors immunity from subsequent judicial prosecution for their ideas if they obtained official approval before publishing.

== Reception and legacy ==
Starting only a few years after his death, biographers portrayed Malesherbes as a romantic figure, one of the innocent victims of the Terror. For example, the 1911 Encyclopædia Britannica writes of him:

Malesherbes is one of the sweetest characters of the 18th century; though no man of action, hardly a man of the world, by his charity and unfeigned goodness he became one of the most popular men in France, and it was an act of truest self-devotion in him to sacrifice himself for a king who had done little or nothing for him.

More recently, the French scholar François Moureau has critiqued this "hagiographic" tradition, emphasizing instead the contradictions in Malesherbes' career: he was shaped both by an openness to new Enlightenment ideas and by his commitment to fulfilling his role as a public servant within the Ancien Régime. Other modern commentaries on Malesherbes have advanced similar arguments; George Kelly, for example, describes him as "Janus-faced."

Malesherbes was also remembered with reverence by his great-grandson Alexis de Tocqueville; the historian Roger Williams has pointed to this connection as a "legacy of liberalism."
