= Jean-Jacques Bacon de la Chevalerie =

French army officer, colonial politician and Free-Mason (1731–1821)

- Born: 1731; Lyon, Kingdom of France
- Died: 1821 (aged 89–90); Paris, Kingdom of France
- Occupations: Army officer, colonial politician
- Known for: Early participation in the codification process associated with the French Rite especially the Orders of Wisdom

Jean-Jacques Bacon de la Chevalerie (1731–1821) was a French army officer, colonial political figure and Free-Mason. He served as Grand Orator of the Grand Orient de France during the organisation's formative period and participated in its earliest attempts to standardise Masonic rituals. In 1773, he was appointed to a commission charged with codifying the degrees practised by French lodges. In 1782, he became president of the Grand Orient's newly established Chamber of Degrees.

These institutions formed part of the prolonged codification process from which the system now known as the French Rite emerged. Bacon's role was principally institutional and organisational: the surviving evidence does not identify him as the sole author of the Rite. The definitive rituals of the three symbolic degrees were completed and approved in 1785, largely under the direction of Alexandre Roëttiers de Montaleau.

Outside Free-Masonry, Bacon pursued a military career and became politically active in the French colony of Saint-Domingue. During the opening phase of the Haitian Revolution, he served as president of the provincial assembly of the colony's Northern Province.
