= Guillaume de Lamoignon de Blancmesnil =

French magistrate

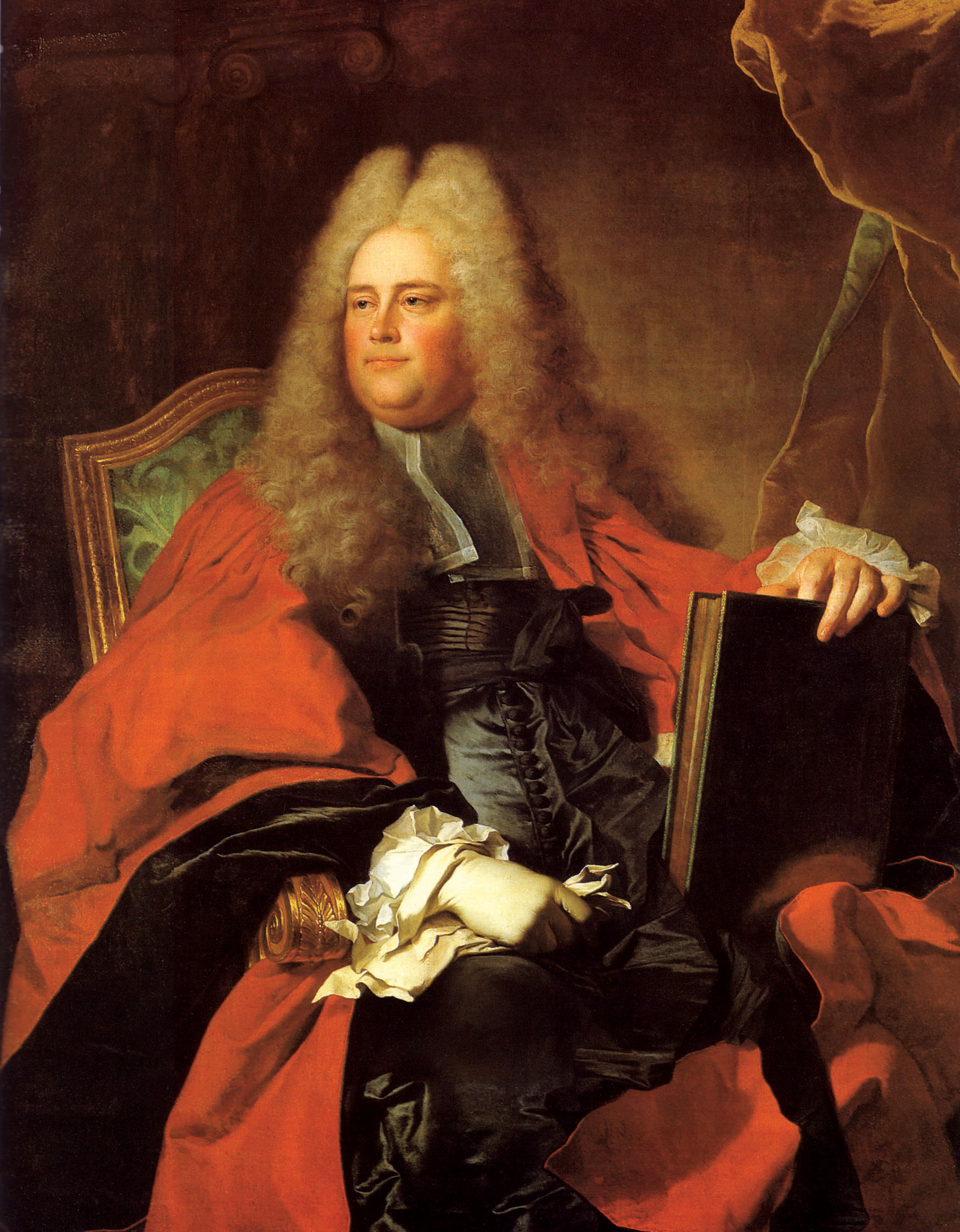
Portrait of Lamoignon de Blancmesnil, by Hyacinthe Rigaud, 1716

Guillaume II de Lamoignon, seigneur de Blancmesnil et de Malesherbes (Paris, 6 March 1683 — 12 July 1772) was a French magistrate.

== Biography ==
The second son of the président Chrétien François de Lamoignon, he was named general avocat for the Parlement of Paris on 2 July 1707 and then became président à mortier to the same parlement on 20 December 1723. He was the Premier Président to the Cour des aides from 9 May 1746 to 1749.

He was an excellent lawyer and loved literature and history. He had impeccable morals (which was rather infrequent in the Parlements of Paris), and rejected Jansenism.

He was named Chancellor of France (without the seal which was trusted earlier to Jean-Baptiste de Machault d'Arnouville) on 9 December 1750, replacing Henri François d'Aguesseau, who had quit. The parlementary revolt was thus his paroxysm, and Lamoignon, far from losing authority, as is usually said, with difficulty supported these coups of the noblesse de robe.

As the King had finished tolerating the weak will of his chancellor, he demanded Lamoignon's resignation. When Lamoignon refused, he was exiled to his château on 3 October 1763.

He was the father of Guillaume-Chrétien de Lamoignon de Malesherbes (1721–1794).

== Residences ==
- Paris:
  - Until 1750, Hôtel d'Angoulême Lamoignon, 24 Rue Pavée. (Today it is the historical library of Paris.)
  - 1750-1768, Hôtel de la Chancellerie, 13 Place Vendôme. (Today it is the Ministry of Justice.)
- Château de Malesherbes in Malesherbes (the present département of Loiret), bought in 1718 from Alexandre d'Illiers d'Entragues.
