= Louis de Courbon, comte de Blénac =

Louis de Courbon, Comte de Blénac

Governor of Saint-Domingue
- In office 13 June 1713 – 1716
- Preceded by: Paul-François de La Grange d'Arquien
- Succeeded by: Charles Joubert de La Bastide

Personal details
- Died: 10 July 1722 Rochefort, Aunis, France
- Occupation: Naval officer

Louis de Courbon, Comte de Blénac, Marquis de Coutré (died 10 July 1722) was governor of the French colony of Saint-Domingue from 1713 to 1716.

== Family ==
Louis de Courbon, Marquis de Coutré, was the second son of Charles de Courbon de Blénac, marquis de la Roche-Courbon (died 10 June 1696), and Angélique de la Rochefoucaut. His father became a maréchal de camp in the king's army, in 1669 became a ship's captain, and in 1677 was made governor and lieutenant general of the French Islands and all the lands of America.

Louis de Courbon had nine brothers and sisters. As a boy he was a page of King Louis XIV. He joined the navy in November 1675, and became a ship's captain (capitaine de vaisseau) in January 1689.

== Governor of Saint-Domingue ==
Haiti, formerly Saint-Domingue. Cap-Français is now called Cap-Haïtien

Blénac was offered the position of Governor of Saint-Domingue to replace Nicolas de Gabaret in a latter of 13 September 1712. He was named governor of Saint-Domingue in place of Nicolas de Gabaret on 1 October 1712, and was received by the Council of Cap François on 13 June 1713. He took over from Paul-François de La Grange d'Arquien, who had acted as governor after Gabaret's death. Blenac found the colony at peace, since under the Treaty of Utrecht the English had left. However, there were constant squabbles over land among the settler families. Blenac had three subordinate governors, that of Saint-Louis on Île-à-Vache opposite Les Cayes on the south coast, another at Léogâne for the east coast, and that of Sainte-Croix for the north coast. The Count of Arguyan, who had been acting governor, resumed his post at the Cap-Français (now Cap-Haïtien), which he commanded as Governor of Sainte-Croix.

The correspondence from the Secretary of State for the Navy to Blénac and the intendant Jean-Jacques Mithon de Senneville from September 1712 to July 1715 has been preserved. It covers finance, provisions, the state of the colony, the Treaty of Utrecht (1713), fortifications, appointments, complaints, trade restrictions and relations with Spain (which occupied the east of the island). Blenac was given strict instructions to prevent foreign trade, which was difficult in Saint-Domingue given the great length of the coastline from which ships could carry goods to and from Jamaica. (Note: France had formally acquired Saint-Domingue in 1697, and in 1701 had secured an asiento to supply slaves to the Spanish colonies. However, the French traders in slaves from Africa were less efficient than the English and Dutch slavers, so there was a shortage of slaves in the French island colonies, and prices were considerably higher. This created a strong incentive for the planters to ignore the French monopoly and buy slaves from the English and Dutch.)

In 1713 Brenac and Mithon reported that the town of Léogâne, founded two years earlier, was growing rapidly. They were doing all they could to encourage settlers to build in the town. There was difficulty in obtaining bricks for barracks and magazines in Léogâne and Petit-Goâve. Lemaire had started a brick making factory at considerable cost but with no result. The right soil had not been found, and the bricks crumbled into small pieces in the rain. De Champ had better results at Cap Français (now Cap-Haïtien), but his bricks cost more than those from France.

On 1 January 1714 the king signed an order making the leeward islands independent of the windward islands. A letter of 10 January 1714 from the Secretary of State for the Navy informed Blénac of the death of Raymond Balthazar Phélypeaux, governor-general of the French West Indies. The West Indies would now have two governors-general, Blénac in Saint-Domingue, and another in the Windward Islands. Further letters discussed black slaves shipped by the Compagnie du Sénégal, taxes, trade, shortage of coinage, sugar factories, negro regulations, lawsuits and piracy. Blenac was less active than Duquesne in the Windward Islands, and had more difficulty pursuing the smugglers. His health could not cope with the tropical climate, and he asked for recall to France.

Blénac returned to France in 1716. He was replaced as governor-general on 1 January 1717 by Charles Joubert de La Bastide, marquis de Châteaumorand. Blénac died in Rochefort on 10 July 1722. He had never married.

== Sources ==
- Bailey, Gauvin Alexander (6 June 2018), Architecture and Urbanism in the French Atlantic Empire: State, Church, and Society, 1604-1830 (in French), MQUP, ISBN 978-0-7735-5376-7
- Courbon, Louis de (décédé en 1722; Comte de Blénac) (in French), ANOM: Archives nationales d'outre-mer
- Dessalles, Adrien (1847), Histoire générale des Antilles ... (in French), Libraire-éditeur
- Marlès, Jean Lacroix de (1858), Histoire descriptive et pittoresque de Saint-Domingue: Haïti (in French), Ad Mame et Cie
- Moreau de Saint-Méry, Médéric Louis Elie (1785), Loix et constitutions des colonies franc̜oises de l'Amérique sous le vent: 1704-1721 (in French), Chez l'auteur
- O'Malley, Gregory E. (2 September 2014), Final Passages: The Intercolonial Slave Trade of British America, 1619-1807, UNC Press Books, ISBN 978-1-4696-1535-6
- Schemmel, B., "Haiti", Rulers.org
- Saint Allais, Nicolas Viton de (1814), Nobiliare universel de France, ou recueil général des généalogies historiques des maisons nobles de ce royaume
- Taillemite, Etienne, "Blénac (Louis de Courbon, comte de Blénac, marquis de Contré)", Secrétariat d'État à la Marine - Correspondance au départ avec les colonies (in French), Archives nationales d'outre-mer
