= Philibert François Rouxel de Blanchelande =

French Army officer and colonial administrator (1735–1793)

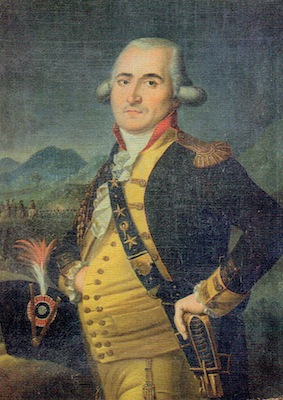

Governor of Tobago
- In office 2 June 1781 – 1784
- Preceded by: George Ferguson
- Succeeded by: Vicomte d'Arrot

Governor of Saint-Domingue
- In office 9 November 1790 – 1792
- Preceded by: Antoine de Thomassin
- Succeeded by: Marquis de La Salle

Personal details
- Born: 21 February 1735 Dijon, France
- Died: 15 April 1793 (aged 58) Paris, France

Military service
- Allegiance: France
- Years of service: 1747–1793
- Rank: Maréchal de camp

Philippe François Rouxel, viscount de Blanchelande (21 February 1735 – 15 April 1793) was a French Army officer and colonial administrator who served as the governor of Saint-Domingue from 1790 to 1792.

== Early life ==
He was born on 21 February 1735 in Dijon, France as the son of officer Claude Rouxel de Blanchelande, illegitimate son of Marshal of France Jacques Eléonor Rouxel de Grancey, and Catherine Braconnier..

== Career ==
He joined the French army, rising to the rank of Maréchal de camp by 1781. In that year, Blanchelande led a French expeditionary force which captured Tobago from the British. He was subsequently made governor of the island, serving from 1781 to 1784.

Blanchelande subsequently succeeded Antoine de Thomassin de Peynier as governor of Saint-Domingue at the end of 1790. In 1791, during the Haitian Revolution, Rouxel led French troops against rebel slaves led by Dutty Boukman. In 1792, he was replaced as governor by Adrien-Nicolas Piédefer, marquis de La Salle, who would himself be replaced by François-Thomas Galbaud du Fort after June 1793.

== Death ==
Convicted of counter-revolutionary actions and treason, Blanchelande was condemned to the guillotine by the Revolutionary Tribunal on 11 April 1793 and executed on 15 April.
