= Adrien-Nicolas Piédefer, marquis de La Salle =

French writer and cavalry officer

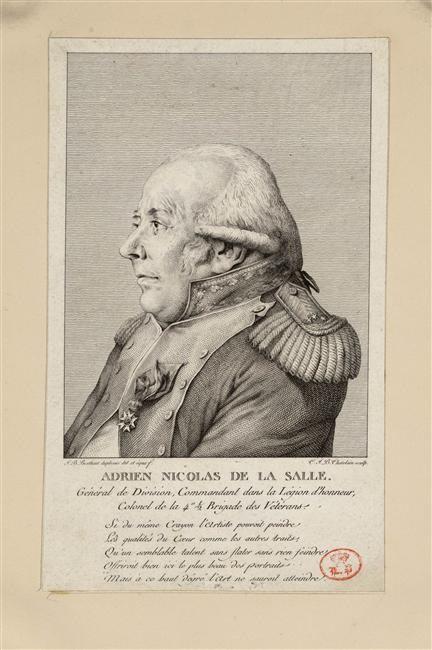
Adrien-Nicolas Piédefer, Marquis de La Salle

Adrien-Nicolas Piédefer, marquis de La Salle, comte d'Offrémont (1735 – 1818) was a French writer and cavalry officer who saw service in the Seven Years' War, a writer of comedies and libretti, and a Masonic brother of Benjamin Franklin.

He was appointed maréchal de camp in 1791; He was appointed Governor of the west province of Saint-Domingue (now Haiti) the following year, and twice governor-general. He was eventually a brigadier general.

In lighter moments he wrote a successful comedy in verse, in three acts, L'oncle et les tantes ("Uncle and aunts"), which was reprinted in 1786. Previously he had supplied the libretti for at least two one-act operas for which the music was composed by François-Joseph Gossec. One, Le périgourdin ("The man from Périgord") was an intermède, a between-acts intermezzo that was presented at the private theatre of the prince de Conti at the Château de Chantilly, 7 June 1761. His one-act pastoral comedy Les pêcheurs, ("The Fishermen") was presented to a Parisian public at the Comédie-italienne, 23 April 1766 and repeated 7 July. His translation of an English novel Histoire de Lucy Wellers, by "Miss Smythies of Colchester" was printed at The Hague in 1766.

The marquis de La Salle was a member of two Masonic lodges in Paris, that of St-Jean d’Ecosse du Contrat Social, then that of Les Neuf Sœurs (1778–1785), where he succeeded Benjamin Franklin as vénérable in 1781.

A Mémoire justificatif pour le marquis de la Salle was printed in 1789.

The Château de Piédefer, Viry-Châtillon, Essonne, near the Seine south of Paris, traditionally attributed to Charles Perrault, is known for its late-seventeenth-century vaulted nymphaeum or grotto encrusted with rock and shellwork in compartments, and an orangery, both listed as Monuments historiques since 1983. The seventeenth-century architecture of the château was modified in the eighteenth century; a parterre survives, with a water jet in a fountain, in the nineteenth-century wooded landscape park.
