= Pierre, marquis de Fayet =

French naval commander

Pierre de Fayet
- Died: 11 July 1737; Petit-Goâve, Saint-Domingue
- Military career
- Allegiance: Kingdom of France
- Branch: French Navy
- Rank: Captain
- Awards: Order of St. Louis

Pierre, marquis de Fayet (died 11 July 1737) was a French naval commander. Serving as a Captain in King Louis XV's navy, Pierre was distinguished by his membership of the Order of St. Louis, and later became the Governor General of the French colony of Saint-Domingue.

== Governorship ==
King Louis XV named Pierre Saint-Dominigue's new Governor-General in July 1732, following the death of the Marquis de Vienne in February. From the beginning of his Governorship, Pierre brought in legislation to combat the increasing numbers of African slaves joining the Maroon rebels.

== Death ==
Pierre died in Petit-Goâve on 11 July 1737. Étienne Cochard de Chastenoy briefly succeeding him as acting Governor-General before Marquis de Larnage's arrival.

== Family ==
Pierre de Fayet married Catherine Olivier. Their son, Alain-Pierre, also became a member of the Order of St. Louis.

== In popular culture ==
Pierre de Fayet appears as the main antagonist in the video game Assassin's Creed: Freedom Cry, which portrays him as a vile and ruthless governor with a particular dislike for slaves, whom he treats harshly and considers to be subhuman and incapable of self-governance. He is killed by the protagonist Adéwalé, an Assassin and former slave, in 1737.

== Notes ==
- Marquis de Magny (1846). Livre d'or de la Noblesse (in French).
- de Saint-Méry, Médéric Louis Elie Moreau (1785). Loix et constitutions des colonies franc̜oises de l'Amérique sous le vent: 1722-1749 (in French). Chez l'auteur.
