= Château de Malesherbes =

French château located in Malesherbes

Coordinates: 48°17′14″N 2°24′57″E

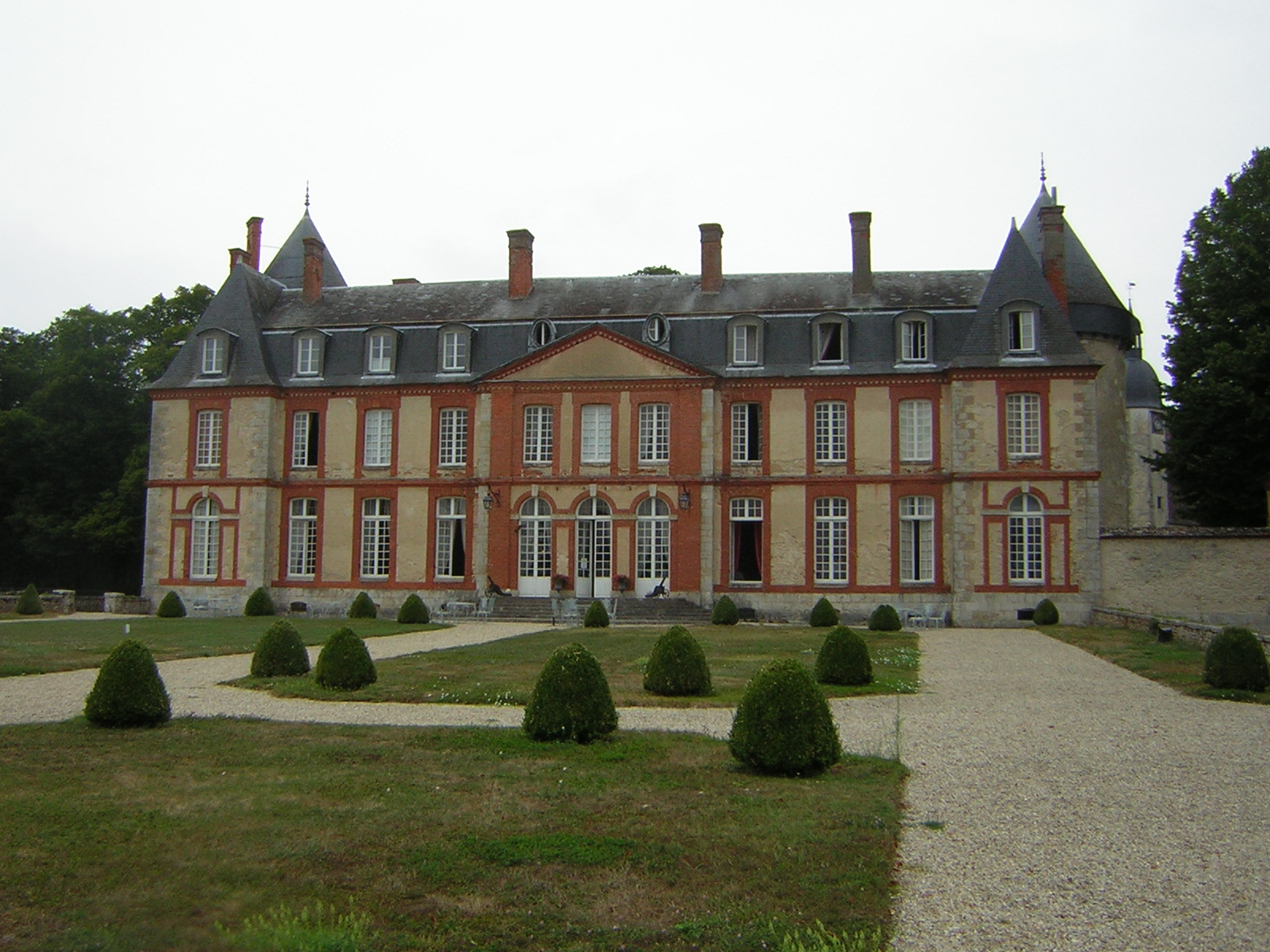
Château de Malesherbes

Château de Malesherbesis is a French château located in Malesherbes, in the commune of Malesherbois and the department of Loiret in the Centre-Val de Loire region.

A first castle on the site is attested, the castle of Bois-Malesherbes, acquired in 1398 by Jean de Montagu, superintendent of finances to Charles VI.
