= César Henri, comte de La Luzerne =

French politician and soldier

César Henri Guillaume de La Luzerne

Governor of Saint-Domingue
- In office 27 April 1786 – November 1787
- Preceded by: Gui-Pierre de Coustard
- Succeeded by: Alexandre de Vincent de Mazade

Personal details
- Born: 23 February 1737 Paris, France
- Died: 24 March 1799 (aged 62) Bernau
- Occupation: Soldier, politician

César Henri Guillaume de La Luzerne (23 February 1737, Paris – 24 March 1799, château de Bernau, near Linz), seigneur de Beuzeville et de Rilly, baron de Chambon, was a French politician and soldier, rising to Lieutenant général des armées and naval minister. He was the son of César-Antoine de La Luzerne, comte de Beuzeville (died 1755) and Marie-Elisabeth de Lamoignon de Blancmesnil (1716-1758).

== Life ==
In 1763 he married Marie Adélaïde Angran d'Alleray (1743-1814), and they had three children:

- César Guillaume 1763-1833
- Anne Françoise 1766-1837
- Blanche Césarine 1770-1859

He was governor-general of Saint-Domingue from 1785 to 1787. On his return he was made an honorary member of the Académie royale des Sciences on 30 August 1788 and served twice as Secretary of State of the Navy, firstly from 24 December 1787 to 13 July 1789, then from 16 July 1789 to 26 October 1790 (both under Louis XVI).
