= Macaya =

Macaya may refer to:

== People ==
- Macaya (military leader), Kongolese-born Haitian revolutionary military leader
- Macaya (surname)

== Places ==
- Pic Macaya, the second-highest mountain in Haiti
  - Pic Macaya National Park
- Macayá River, a river of Colombia
- Casa Macaya, a Modernist building located in Barcelona
- Edificio Macaya, a historic building built in San José, Costa Rica

== Other uses ==
- Copa Macaya, a football competition contested by clubs from Catalonia, which ran from 1900 until 1903
- Macaya breast-spot frog, a species of frog in the family Eleutherodactylidae

== See also ==
- Macaye, a commune in the Pyrénées-Atlantiques department in south-western France
