= Battle of Cap-Français (1793) =

1793 Haitian Revolution conflict

- Part of the Haitian Revolution
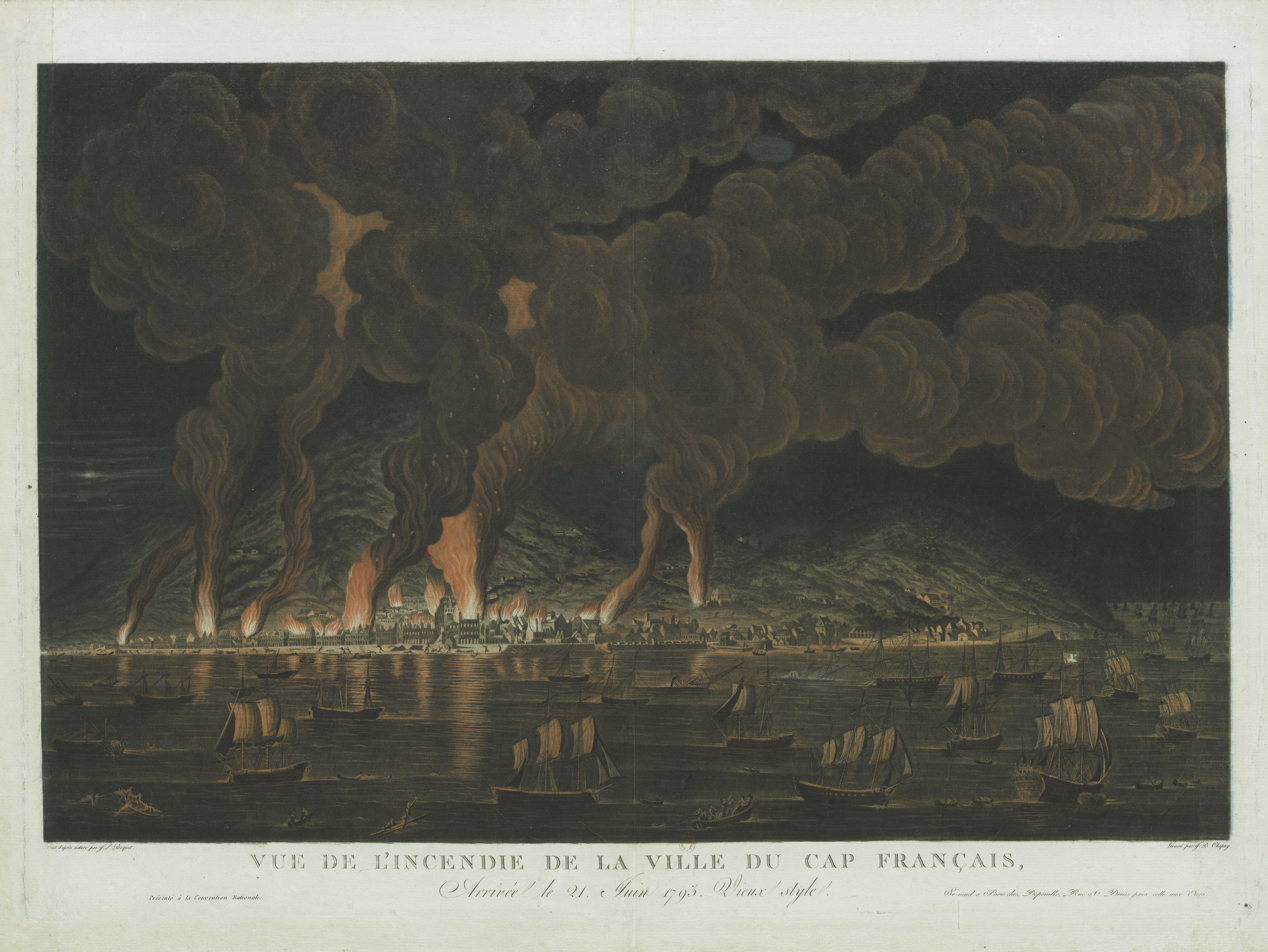
- Cap-Français on fire during the battle, 21 June 1793
| Date | 20–22 June 1793 |
| Location | Cap-Français, Saint-Domingue |
| Result | Commissioner victory |

Belligerents
| Commissioners: Mulattoes and free people of color Republicans; Republican whites loyal to commissioners Black slaves insurgents and royalists | Opponents to the commissioners: French Grands blancs Royalist settlers French Petits blancs Republican settlers Slaves of armed settlers |

Commanders and leaders
| Léger-Félicité Sonthonax; Étienne Polverel; Jean-Baptiste Belley | François-Thomas Galbaud du Fort; César Galbaud du Fort |

Strength
| 2,000 to 3,500 men | 10,000 men |

Casualties and losses
- 500 deaths

The Battle of Cap-Français took place from 20 to 22 June 1793 during the Haitian Revolution. It was originally a conflict between commissioners sent by the French Republican government, who were supported by rebellious slaves and free people of color, against the colony's elite and white royalist slave owners, who sparked an uprising against the commissioners in the city, led to a military conflict between whites and coloreds within the city, to eventually lead to an attack by slaves throughout the city.

== Prelude ==
=== Arrival of Commissioners in Saint-Domingue ===
On 17 September 1792, the commissars Léger-Félicité Sonthonax, Étienne Polverel and Jean-Antoine Ailhaud landed in Cap-Français with 6,000 men from the French Republican army. Their mission was to pacify Saint-Domingue and enforce the law of April 4, which proclaimed the right to vote for free people, including blacks and mulattoes, and imposed the dissolution of the white-only colonial assembly.

Sonthonax remained in post at the French Cape while Polverel left for inspection in Port-au-Prince in October. Allhaud went south of the colony but quickly returned to France after becoming ill.

=== Military operations against the revolt ===
The 6,000 French soldiers, half composed of troops of line and the other half of volunteers, were ordered to repress the insurrections of the black slaves revolting in the north-west of the island and commanded by Jean-François Papillon and Georges Biassou. But these troops, unaccustomed to the climate, were rapidly decimated by yellow fever. Two months after their landing, writes General Lacroix, "3,000 were harvested" of the 6,000 men.

All of the French republican forces were under the command of General Étienne Maynaud de Bizefranc de Laveaux, who entered the campaign against the revolted slaves in January 1793. At the battles of Morne Pelé and Tannerie Laveaux defeated the revolutionaries and quickly reconquered the northern plains. However, the insurgents had allied with the Spaniards, and Spanish troops were embedded as an auxiliary in their army. In the months following, the French begin to lose the ground gained.

=== Commissioners' positions on slavery ===
Sonthonax and Polverel were close to Brissot, a notorious abolitionist and a member of the Society of Black Friends. The commissioners themselves were members of the Jacobin Club, which promoted the creation of revolutionary clubs in Saint-Domingue that attracted many poor whites, or petits blancs (little whites). Conversely, wealthy slave owners or grands blancs (big whites) were usually royalists and thus hostile to Jacobin activities.

Although abolitionists themselves, Sonthonax and Polverel had no authority to abolish slavery, nor did the French government have the intention to do so. Sonthonax did not believe in immediate abolition himself, writing that such action "would inevitably lead to the massacre of all whites".

=== Deportation of Governors and dissolution of colonial Assembly ===
According to the law of August 10, anyone who objected to the commissioners was declared a "traitor to the fatherland". The commissioners had every power to deport their opponents. Sonthonax arrested Governor Philippe François Rouxel de Blanchelande on September 20, suspected of conspiracy, who was then deported to France where he was guillotined on April 11, 1793. He was replaced by General d'Esparbes, a royalist, who attempted to provoke an insurrection when he learned of the fall of the monarchy on the Insurrection of 10 August 1792. He was then arrested and deported.

On October 12, the white-only colonial assembly was dissolved and replaced by a commission composed of whites and free people of color. This measure brings together the free people of color to the commissioners. Sonthonax sought to integrate Mulatto officers in the Cape Regiment, then entirely composed of whites, who were resistant towards integration. During a parade in town, mulattoes and whites of the Cape regiment clashed in a shootout. The authority of the commissioners could be re-established only with the help of General Laveaux.

=== Rise of dissatisfaction of settlers against commissioners ===
These measures, favorable to the mulattoes and the free people of color, provoked the irritation of the grands blancs who fear the abolition of slavery.

Although this message is generally false, the settlers were increasingly hostile to the commissioners. The petits blancs republicans, were at first favorable to them, but they are as hostile as the grands blancs to mulattoes and to men free of colors, whom they hate even more than the first. Also the grands blancs and the petits blancs, formerly enemies, allied themselves against the commissioners, the mulattoes and the free people of colors.

=== First revolts ===
On January 25, 1793, in Port-au-Prince, the colonists, led by Borel, armed their slaves, joined forces with the soldiers of the Artois regiment and made themselves masters of the city. The colonists then sent a courier to London and declare themselves ready to pass under the suzerainty of the Kingdom of Great Britain in exchange for the conservation of their laws. The troops loyal to the commissioners commanded by generals Lassale and Beauvais besiege to Port-au-Prince, which is retaken on April 14, 1793.

The colonists of Jérémie in the south of the island revolt in their turn, they form a government which takes the name of "Federation of Grande Anse", arm their slaves and make massacre the free of color, whose heads are brought on spades and exposed at Fort Lapointe. The board of directors forms an army composed of whites commanded by La Chaise and blacks commanded by Noël Bras. In order to suppress this rebellion, the commissioners also organize an army commanded by the mulatto André Rigaud. The mulattoes and the free of color also arm their slaves and led by Rigaud, take possession of Jacmel but they fail to take Jeremiah.

== The insurrection of whites in Cap-Français ==
On May 7, 1793, while the commissioners were busy fighting the rebellion in the south, Brigadier General François-Thomas Galbaud du Fort, of the Republican army, landed in Cap-Français to hold the post of governor. This nomination arouses the hopes of the colonists because Galbaud does not show any favor for mulattoes and free people. The colonists show more and more openly their opposition to the commissioners, and Sonthonax and Polverel must hastily return to Cape Town on June 10. Whites and mulattos are then on the brink of confrontation.

The commissioners begin by ousting Galbaud. He is Creole and according to the April law, creoles can not perform public functions in the colonies. Galbaud submits and on June 13, he embarks for France on the ship Normandy. This departure despairs the settlers, but also stirs discontent with the sailors and soldiers of the Republican Navy. A dispute had arisen between a naval officer and a mulatto. The sailors complained to the commissioners but they refuse to intervene in the case, which angers the sailors. Their resentment against the commissioners because of the prohibition that forces the sailors to stay on land at night. Shortly afterwards a ship entered the harbor carrying 25 to 30 colonists and about 40 soldiers of the Artois regiment taken prisoner during the insurrection of Port-au-Princes, who were to be deported to France "to learn how to lose their color prejudice," According to one observer.

Exasperated, settlers and sailors sent a delegation to Galbaud on June 19 asking him to take the lead in the insurgency that was being prepared against the commissioners and mulattoes. Galbaud accepted, and in the night of June 19 to 20, he arrived at Cap-Français with the sailors joined by the colonists. Soon Galbaud was leading 2,000 to 3,500 men.

Alerted, the mulatto soldiers take up arms, determined to defend the commissioners. Fierce street battles were taking place, but General Lavaux was too ill to take command. The commissioners entrust command to Colonel Mulatto Antoine Chanlatte, who is assisted by the black officer Jean-Baptiste Belley, known as "Mars Belley".

== Slave offensive ==
After two days of fighting, the commissioners evacuated Cap-Français and retreated to Haut du Cap. There they established their headquarters at the Bréda plantation. Out of strength, the two commissioners decided to call for help from the rebellious slaves against whom they had formerly fought, offering emancipation in return for aid. Sonthonax wrote the following proclamation:

We declare that the will of the French Republic and its delegates is to give freedom to all the Negro warriors who will fight for the Republic under the orders of the civil commissars, against Spain or other enemies, whether they are interior or exterior... All declared slaves free by the Republic shall be equal to all free men, they have the rights of french citizens.

The proclamation was entrusted to the Mulatto officer Antoine Chanlatte who, accompanied by two white adventurers, Ginioux and Galineux Degusy, gave it to the rebel slaves who camped on the heights of Morne du Cap.

On June 21, 10,000 rebel slaves commanded by Macaya and Pierrot arrive on Cap-Français, where the white insurgents were completely overwhelmed. They fled and boarded the ships in great confusion in the retirement of the sailors get drunk and plundered several houses and shops they occupied.

The fighting on June 21 is the bloodiest, there are 500 corpses, several fall or are thrown into the sea where they are devoured by sharks. The commissioners decide to send Polverel's son to negotiate with the insurgents. But Galbaud refuses any discussion and holds the emissary prisoner, shortly after Galbaud's brother is taken by the men loyal to the commissioners. Sonthonax is ready to accept an exchange of prisoners but Polverel refuses, according to witnesses, tears in his eyes he says: "No, my son can not be exchanged for a culprit".

In the confusion, a group of blacks attempts to burn a prison to deliver many of their prisoners, but the flames are gaining other homes and homes of what was considered the most beautiful cities in the West Indies are destroyed.

== Pillage of Cap-Français ==
The city was subjected to several days of pillage. The pillage and subsequent burning has been described in numerous memoirs and diaries and other contemporary works, notably by H. D. de Saint-Maurice, editor of the Moniteur général de la partie française de Saint-Domingue. Several scenes from the pillage became known, such as when the rebels put on the clothes from private homes as well as the costume from the Comédie du Cap.

During the pillage and fire of the city, many civilians lost their lives and were "massacred", according to some eyewitnesses. Most of the white civilian population (as well as some of the rich gens de couleur libres) took refuge on the ships which had crowded in the city harbor awaiting the commissioner's permission to depart, and left the island with them.

Many of the most famous buildings were lost during the fire of Cap‑Français of 1793 on June 21–26, among them the Comédie du Cap and the Communauté des Religieuses Filles de Notre-Dame du Cap-Français.

== Conclusion ==
On 24 June, du Fort and survivors, numbering several thousand, embarked on the ships the Aeolus and Jupiter and several frigates in the harbor of Cape Town. From there they fled to the United States where they found refuge.

The Commissioners took possession of the Cap-Français, but the city nicknamed "the Jewel of the West Indies" was five-sixths destroyed. Nevertheless, they hoped to win the rallying of rebel slaves, but they were quickly disappointed. Some accept but the majority of them have returned to the mountains with their booty. Couriers are sent to Jean-François Papillon and Georges Biassou but they refuse to recognize the Republic, they declare themselves royalists and subject of the King of Spain since the King of France had been executed. Contacted, Toussaint Louverture refused to rally "republican traitors" and wrote that "the blacks wanted to serve under a king and the King of Spain offered him his protection".

== Bibliography ==
- Bell, Madison Smartt (2007). Toussaint Louverture. Actes Sud.
- Madiou, Thomas (1847). Histoire d'Haïti, Tome I (in French).
- Schœlcher, Victor (1982) [1889]. Vie de Toussaint Louverture (in French). Éditions Karthala.
