= Minette et Lise =

Haitian stage artists

Minette et Lise was a sister couple of two stage artists, active in Saint Domingue in Pre-revolutionary Haiti. They consisted of Elisabeth Alexandrine Louise Ferrand, stage name "Minette" (11 July 1767 in Port-au-Prince – 2 January 1807 in New Orleans) and Lise (born 1771). They have become known as Minette et Lise (Minette and Lise).

== Biography ==
Minette and Lise were born in Port-au-Prince in Saint-Domingue, in 1767 and 1771 respectively. They belonged to the affranchi class of free colored: their father was white, and their mother, Elisabeth Mahotière, Mahaultière or Daguin, was a free affranchi of African origin. They also had a brother, Louis Joseph Marin.

During their childhood, the sisters were trained in acting by their mother. The artistic talents of the sisters were discovered by Madame Acquaire, an influential actress and opera singer of the Comédie de Port-au-Prince. She offered them lessons in singing and acting, which they accepted.

=== Career in Saint Domingue ===
In 1780, they debuted together in the ballet La Danse sur le Volcan at the Comédie de Port-au-Prince. The debut was a success, and on 25 December of that year, Minette were engaged at the theatre by François Saint-Martin. Though only three colored actors are mentioned as artists of note in Saint-Domingue prior to the revolution, descriptions of colored artists on stage are common from diarists of the era, and the fact that they were colored should not necessarily have been an obstacle, though their success may have been somewhat more unusual.

Minette in particular was noted as a singer. On 13 February 1781, she performed as Isabelle in the opera Isabelle et Gertrude. During the 1780s, she became one of the most popular operatic artists in Saint-Domingue and the prima donna of Port-au-Prince, as Jeanne-Marie Marsan had the same position at the Comédie du Cap in Cap-Francais. She also attracted criticism, such as for her luxurious costumes. In 1787, she was described as being in the highest point of her career. She did not marry, but had at least three children; François Charles Denis (1782–1789) with lieutenant Denis Cottineau; Marie-Jeanne (born 1786) with Etienne Palot; and Louise Françoise Théodore (1789–1790) with Théodore Roberjot du Désert.

Lise, though not as famed as Minette, also enjoyed a successful career. She had her breakthrough in Cayes in 1784, and toured the smaller stages in Les Cayes, Jérémie, Petit-Goâve, Jacmel, Léogâne, and Saint-Marc where she is said to have enjoyed triumphs.

Among the Minette et Lise's roles were Sylvain, Zémire et Azor, Aucassin et Nicolette, L'Amant jaloux and La caravane du Caire.

=== Later life ===
Minette is last mentioned when she performed in La répétition interrompue by Charles Mozard 4 October 1789. Lise are last mentioned when she performed in Faux Lord ou le Pacotilleur 24 January 1789.

There has been several theories about their later life and death, and they have been speculated to have died during the Haitian Revolution.

The Comédie de Port-au-Prince was burned on 22 November 1791, and its actors are reported to have fled to New Orleans. Minette was among those emigrating to New Orleans, where she died in 1807. In New Orleans, she was referred to by the name Minette Ferrand. Minette, as well as Lise, may have performed at the Theatre de la Rue Saint Pierre.

== Legacy ==
Minette et Lise are the subject of Marie Chauvet's novel La Danse sur le Volcan (Paris: Plon, 1957; Paris / Léchelle: Maisonneuve & Larose / Emina Soleil, 2004 (reprint with a preface by Catherine Hermary-Vieille); Léchelle: Zellige, 2008, 2009)[3] Translated into English by Salvator Attanasio as Dance on the Volcano (New York: William Sloane Associates, 1959)
