= Mlle Marthe =

French opera singer

Mlle Marthe (d. after 1783), was a French stage actress and theatre director, active in Saint-Domingue.

Marthe was originally engaged as an actress and singer at the Comédie du Cap in Cap-Francais, which was founded in 1764. The name of Mlle Marthe is associated with the foundation of theatre in Saint-Marc. That city was at the time the second largest city of Saint-Domingue, which was known for its great theatrical interest. In 1767, the first theatre play was staged in a temporary barracks hall at Saint-Marc by the actors Charron and Goulart from Comédie du Cap, and a permanent playhouse with 400 seats was built. A Monsieur Duval was originally named director for the Comédie de Saint-Marc, but Marthe bought the concession and took the position of director of the theatre herself. She managed the theatre in association with a female assistant and co-director, the actress Mlle Francheville. This business arrangement between two women in the theatre world was unique, but several women were to become known for their influence within the theatre world in Saint-Domingue, such as Madame Acquaire, director of the theatre of Petit-Gouave (1770s), and Madame Case, co-director with her spouse of the theatre in Les Cayes (1785).

The 1770 Port-au-Prince earthquake razed the theatre to the ground during a performance of Rousseau's le Devin du Village. Marthe's sponsors immediately financed the building of a new playhouse, and in the meantime the directors continued to schedule the comedies and light operas in a large tent. The new Comédie de Saint-Marc was inaugurated in 1773, with 500 seats ninety feet in length, fifty feet in width, with two ranks of loges (it was burned by order of Jean-Jacques Dessalines in 1802).

She performed in the operas L'Ami de la maison by Gretry (1778), La Fee Urgele by Duni (1781), Les trois Fermiers by Monvel-Dezede, and a concert at the Comédie de Port-au-Prince in 1783.
