= Étienne Maynaud de Bizefranc de Laveaux =

French Army officer, colonial administrator and politician

Governor of Saint-Domingue
- In office 13 June 1793 – 11 May 1796
- Preceded by: François-Thomas Galbaud du Fort
- Succeeded by: Léger-Félicité Sonthonax

Deputy for Saint-Domingue
- In office 14 October 1795 – 13 April 1799

Deputy for Saône-et-Loire
- In office 13 April 1799 – 10 November 1799

Deputy for Saône-et-Loire
- In office 4 November 1820 – 24 December 1823

Personal details
- Born: 8 August 1751 Digoin, Saône-et-Loire, France
- Died: 12 May 1828 (aged 76) Cormatin, Saône-et-Loire, France
- Occupation: Soldier, politician

Étienne Maynaud de Bizefranc de Laveaux (8 August 1751 – 12 May 1828) was a French Army officer, colonial administrator and politician who served as the governor of Saint-Domingue from 1793 to 1796. Serving during the Haitian Revolution, he ensured that the Law of 4 February 1794 was enforced, and supported the black leader Toussaint Louverture. After the Bourbon Restoration in France he was Deputy for Saône-et-Loire from 1820 to 1823.

== Early years ==
Etienne Mayneaud Bizefranc de Laveaux was born on 8 August 1751 in Digoin, Saône-et-Loire, France. He was descended from an ancient and noble Burgundian family. His father was Hugues, lord of Bizefranc, Laveaux and Pancemont (1716–1781), Receiver of the King's Farms. His mother was Marie-Jeanne de Baudoin. He was the third of six children born between 1749 and 1756. As was customary for a younger son, he joined the army, entering the 16th dragoons at the age of 17. His military career was mundane. He seems to have often lived in Paray-le-Monial, near his birthplace. That is where he married Marie-Jacobie-Sophie de Guillermin, daughter of a local aristocrat, in 1784.

== Revolutionary period ==
=== Military leader ===
Haiti, formerly Saint-Domingue. Cap-Français is now called Cap-Haïtien

The French Revolution began in 1789. Laveaux was promoted to squadron leader in 1790, and became a general councillor for Saône-et-Loire that year. In 1791 he was implicated in a counterfeit money affair, but was cleared of all suspicion and acquitted. He arrived in Saint-Domingue on 19 September 1792 with the civil commissioners Léger-Félicité Sonthonax and Étienne Polverel as lieutenant-colonel in command of a detachment of 200 men of the 16th regiment of dragoons. The commissioners found that many of the white planters were hostile to the increasingly radical revolutionary movement and were joining the royalist opposition. The commissioners announced that they did not intend to abolish slavery, but had come to ensure that free men had equal rights whatever their color. In October news arrived that the king had been suspended and France was now a republic.

Laveaux was placed in charge of the northwest part of the colony, based in Port-de-Paix. His commander, General Rochambeau, praised his conduct in taking the fort of Ouanaminthe on the Spanish border in the northeast, which was being held by black slaves in revolt. The city of Cap Français (Cap-Haïtien) at this time was in turmoil. Some of the troops helped the white settlers restore the slave order in the city, while others, particularly those under Laveaux, supported the civil commissioners and wanted to protect the mulattoes, a prime target of the planters. Laveaux was promoted to the command of the Northern province.

In January 1793 Laveux led a force that included free-colored troops against slave insurgents in the town of Milot and drove them back into the mountains. That month Louis XVI was executed in Paris, and in February 1793 France declared war on Spain and Britain. In May or June 1793 the black rebel leader Toussaint Louverture contacted Laveaux and proposed "avenues of reconciliation", but Laveaux rejected his offer.

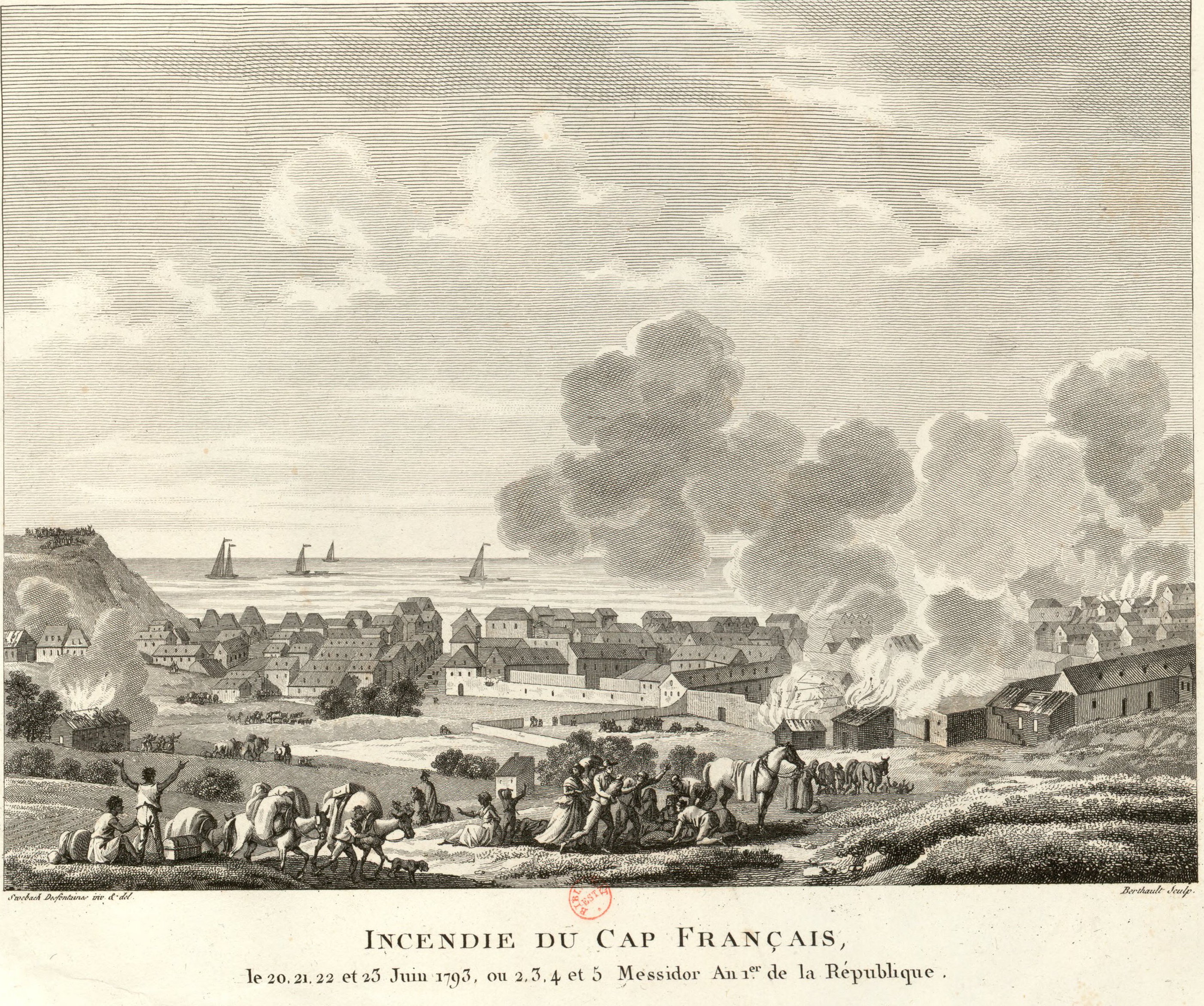
Cap-Français burning during Galbaud's revolt

François-Thomas Galbaud du Fort was appointed Governor General of Saint-Domingue on 6 February 1793 in place of Jean-Jacques d'Esparbes. He reached Cap-Français (Cap-Haïtien) on 7 May 1793. On 8 May 1793 he wrote a letter to Polvérel and Sonthonax announcing his arrival. The commissioners arrived at Cap-Français on 10 June 1793, where they were welcomed by the colored people but received a cold reception from the whites. They heard that Galbaud was friendly with the faction that was hostile to the commission, and did not intend to obey them. Polvérel and Sonthonax dismissed him on 13 June 1793 and ordered him to embark on the Normande and return to France. They made Laveaux acting governor in his place.

On the 20 June 1793 Galbaud proclaimed that he was resuming office and called for assistance in expelling the civil commissioners. He landed at 3:30 p.m. at the head of 3,000 men, who met no resistance at first. A confused struggle followed between the sailors and white settlers in support of Galbaud, and European troops, mulattoes and insurgent blacks in support of the commissioners. On 21 June 1793 the commissioners proclaimed that all blacks who would fight for them against the Spanish and other enemies would be freed. The black insurgents joined the white and mulatto forces and drove the sailors out of the city on 22–23 June. Galbaud left with the fleet bound for the United States on 24–25 June. Commissioner Sonthonax proclaimed universal freedom on 29 August 1793. A month later British troops landed in Saint-Domingue, and were welcomed by royalist colonists and troops.

=== Governor of Saint-Domingue ===
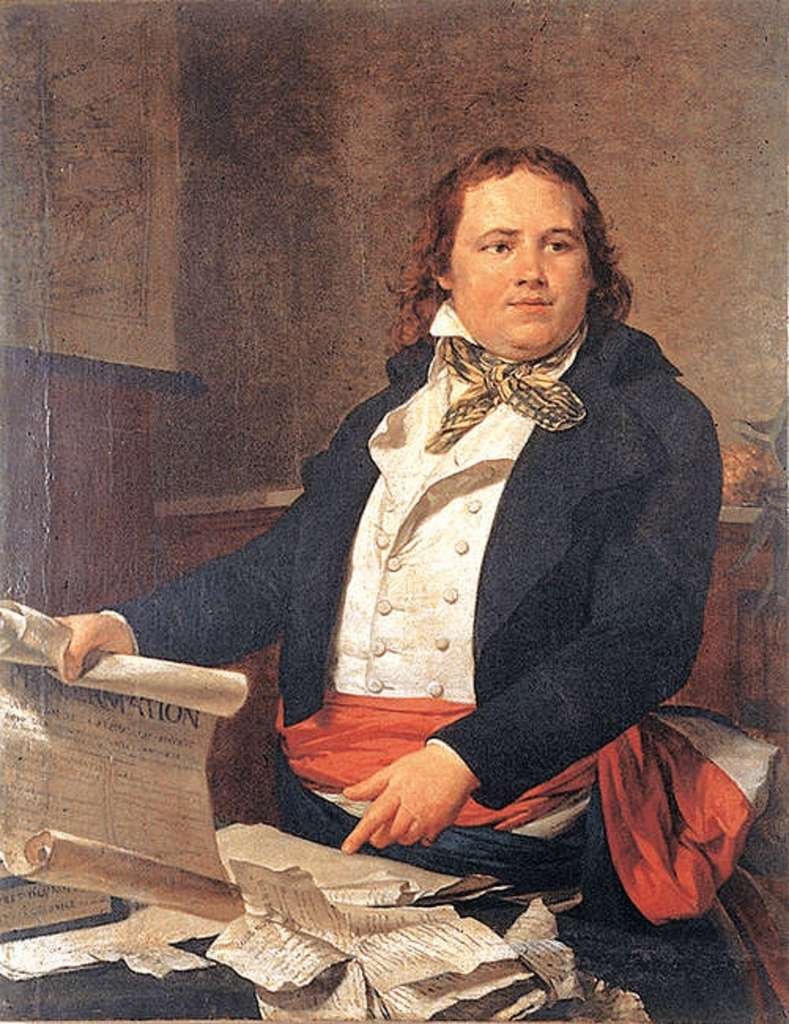
Léger-Félicité Sonthonax

Laveaux was appointed governor general in an acting role until the French government confirmed Sonthonax's choice. He was governor of Saint-Domingue during a crucial period of its history. The former governor de la Salle left the colony spouting invective against the commissioners. He thought that collective enfranchisement of slaves was much worse than treason, as did all the whites and many of the mulattoes. In October 1793 Sonthonax left Port-de-Paix for Port-au-Prince, taking all his staff and funds, and leaving Laveaux in charge.

Laveaux was now isolated with a force of 1,700 men in Port-de-Paix. The people of the town were largely hostile, and the country people were rebellious. The black troops under Pierrot were very reluctant to recognize his authority, and the white troops petitioned to be repatriated to France. The mulatto Jean Villatte was defending Cap-Français and Fort-Dauphin (Fort-Liberté) against the Spanish. Sonthonax was having great difficulty maintaining his authority in Port-Républicain, formerly Port-au-Prince. Rigaud was defending Jérémie and Les Cayes in the south. Laveaux made contact with the French chargé d'affaires in Charleston, South Carolina, who supplied some food and powder at the end of 1793. With much difficulty he managed to get the planters to start paying the former slaves to work.

In the spring of 1794 Laveaux reported some military success in the northwest peninsula, and that the economy was starting up again. The French government's decree of 16 Pluviôse an II (4 February 1794) freed the slaves, and news of this historic event reached Saint-Domingue in May 1794. On 5 May 1794 Laveaux sent a letter to Louverture asking him to leave the Spanish and join the French Republicans. Louverture accepted in his reply of 18 May 1794. On 24 May 1794 Laveaux wrote to Polverel that "Toussaint Louverture, one of the three chiefs of the African royalists, in coalition with the Spanish Government, has at last discovered his true interests and that of his brothers; he has realized that kings can never be the friends of liberty; he fights today for the Republic at the head of an armed force." Laveaux and Toussaint met for the first time on 8 August 1794, and immediately became good friends. From then on, each would often praise and support the other.

Toussaint L'Ouverture c. 1800

With Louverture's change of allegiance, the line of military posts from Gonaïves to the border with Spanish Santo Domingo came under French control, greatly improving their position with respect to British occupational forces to the south of that line. Laveaux was able to move from his confined position at Port-de-Paix to the northern capital of Cap Français (Cap-Haïtien), now a mulatto stronghold under Jean Villatte. British occupational authorities in Saint-Domingue implemented laws imported from the British West Indies which discriminated against free people of color, which caused many free Black people to turn against them. Laveaux told them they would be better off under Republican rule, and also warned the free people of colour in Saint-Marc that if they did not surrender he would tell Louverture to sack the town and only spare the "former slaves".

Alexandre Lebas and Victor Hugues, the commissioners of Guadeloupe, heard of the Thermidor upheavals (July 1794) in which the Jacobins lost power. They hastened to affirm their non-partisan loyalty to the Republic. They pointed out that in Guadeloupe they had accomplished the liberation of the slaves without trouble, whereas in Saint-Domingue most of the former slaves had abandoned the plantations and the situation was still disturbed. Laveaux had also failed to expel the British from Saint-Domingue. The commissioners Sonthonax and Polverel returned to Paris to answer charges from the exiled planters concerning their emancipation decree. When Sonthonax left the colony, Laveaux became the most senior of the French leaders. After Rochambeau capitulated in Martinique, Laveaux was completely isolated in the Caribbean.

When Toussaint changed sides he brought 4,000 seasoned and disciplined soldiers, and these contributed to the series of victories in 1795. The government in France was impressed, and Sonthonax and Polverel were fully exonerated. Laveaux was promoted to divisional general on 25 May 1795. In July 1795 the National Convention praised the army of Saint-Domingue and its governor Laveaux. As governor Laveaux ensured that the abolition of slavery proclaimed on 4 February 1794 was put into effect, and organized the integration of former slaves into the republican society of Saint-Domingue.

On 22 Vendemiaire, year IV (14 October 1795) he was appointed to the Council of Ancients as deputy for Saint-Domingue. Jean Villatte, the mulatto general in command of the northern military department, attempted a coup against Laveaux, and imprisoned him and his aides-de-camp on 20 March 1796. A week later Toussaint marched on Cap-Français and freed him. In return Laveaux appointed Toussaint Lieutenant-General to the Government of Saint-Domingue.

=== Return to France ===
Later in 1796 Louverture suggested that as Saint-Domingue's deputy in the French National Convention, Laveaux should return to France to fight the growing pro-slavery lobby in Paris. Laveaux agreed, and left the island in October 1796. In the Conseil des Anciens Laveaux was active in promoting Neo-Jacobin ideas within the framework of the bourgeois republic. He believed in equal rights for all, and wanted the French constitution to apply equally to the colonies. In February 1799 on the fifth anniversary of the act that liberated the slaves, Laveaux proclaimed:

On 16 Pluviôse, the Republic achieved a conquest of a kind that until then was unknown. She conquered, or rather created, for the human race, through a single strong and precise idea, a million new beings, and in doing so expanded the family of man."

On 24 Germinal year VII (13 April 1799) Laveaux was unanimously reelected to the Council of Ancients for the department of Saône-et-Loire with 248 votes. Laveaux defended all political societies, particularly the Salle du Manège in August 1799.

== Directory and Empire ==
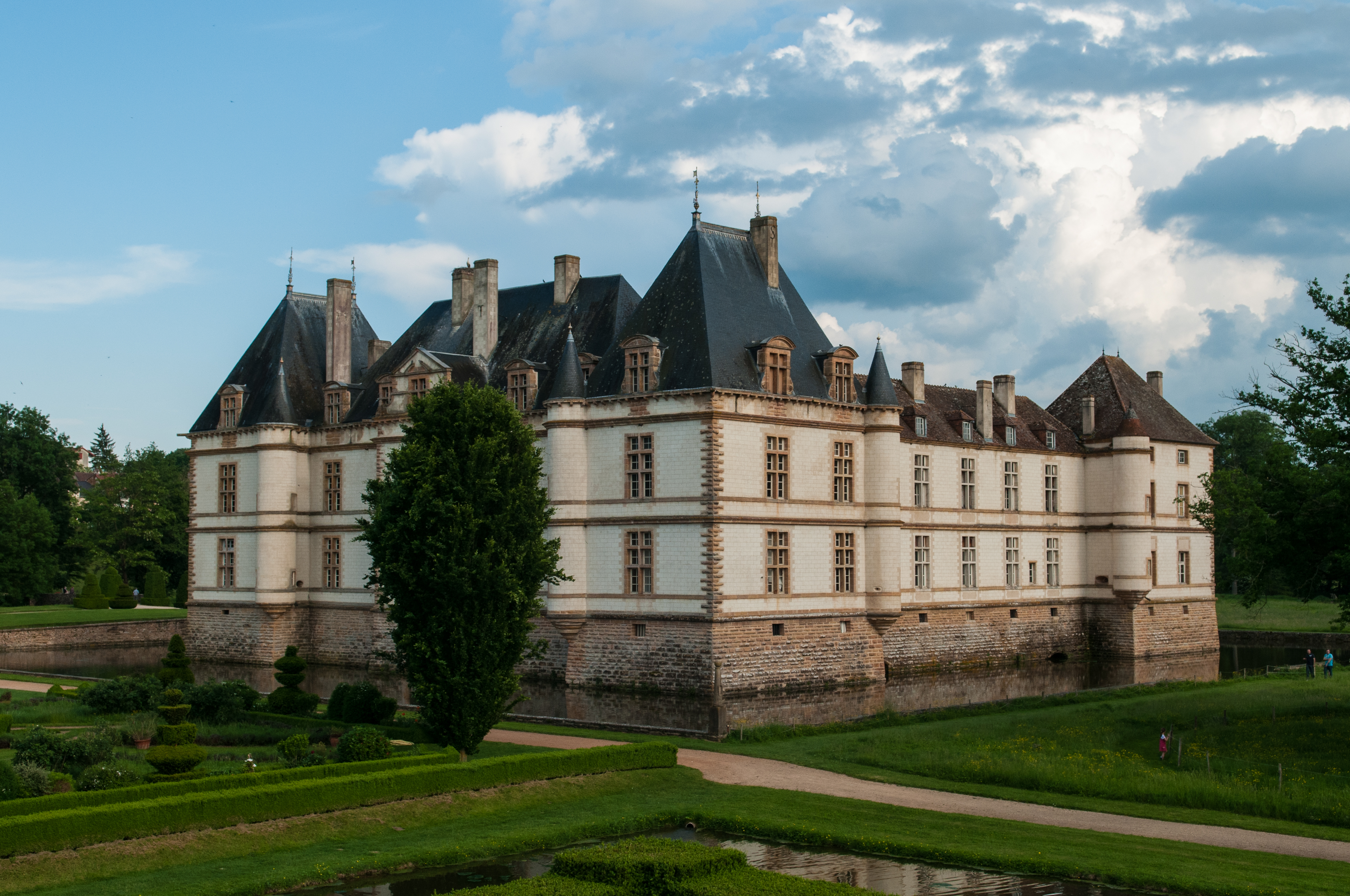
Château de Cormatin

Laveaux was appointed the government's agent in Guadeloupe on 31 August 1799. His mission was then changed, and in October 1799 he was to go to Saint-Domingue, but he did not reach that island. By order of Napoleon he was arrested on 1 March 1800. On the way back he was captured by the English on 4 March 1800. The First Consul Napoleon dismissed Laveaux from office in 1801. Under the First French Empire Laveaux was not active in public, although he was appointed commander of the National Guard of Besançon. During this period of forced retirement he acquired the Château de Cormatin, which he renovated.

== Deputy ==
Under the second Bourbon Restoration, in the second legislature Laveaux was deputy for the department of Saône-et-Loire from 4 November 1820 to 24 December 1823. He represented the first district of Saône-et-Loire (Mâcon). He sat on the left, voted with the constitutional opposition, and vigorously defended the rights of the old army.

Laveaux died in the Château de Cormatin on 12 May 1828, in Cormatin, Saône-et-Loire. A commemorative plaque at the entrance to Cormatin Castle says that General Laveaux played a vital role in the insurrection of the slaves of Saint-Domingue that was followed by the first victory of a slave revolt leading to the creation of the first black republic in history with Haiti on 1 January 1804. His voluminous correspondence with Toussaint-Louverture has been preserved and is a major source of information for historians of the period.

== Sources ==
- Ardouin, Beaubrun (1853), Étude sur l'histoire d'Haïti, vol. 2, Dezobry et E. Magdeleine, Lib.-éditeurs
- Bell, Madison Smartt (18 December 2007), Master of the Crossroads, Knopf Doubleday Publishing Group, ISBN 978-0-307-42679-6
- Cormack, William S. (1 January 2019), Patriots, Royalists, and Terrorists in the West Indies: The French Revolution in Martinique and Guadeloupe, 1789-1802, University of Toronto Press, ISBN 978-1-4875-0395-6
- Dubois, Laurent (30 June 2009), Avengers of the New World: The Story of the Haitian Revolution, Harvard University Press, ISBN 978-0-674-03436-5
- Forsdick, Charles; Høgsbjerg, Christian (2017), "Black Jacobin Ascending", Toussaint Louverture : A Black Jacobin in the Age of Revolutions, Pluto Press, pp. 54–80, ISBN 9780745335155, JSTOR j.ctt1pv89b9.8
- Gainot, Bernard (October–December 1989), "Le Général Laveaux Gouverneur de Saint-Domingue Député Néo-Jacobin", Annales historiques de la Révolution française, 278 (278), Armand Colin: 433–454, doi:10.3406/ahrf.1989.1281, JSTOR 41915691
- Horn, James J.; Lewis, Jan Ellen; Onuf, Peter S. (29 December 2002), The Revolution of 1800: Democracy, Race, and the New Republic, University of Virginia Press, ISBN 978-0-8139-2413-7
- "Mémoire d'Etienne Maynaud de Lavaux", Mémoires des abolitions de l'Esclavage (in French)
- Robert, Adolphe; Cougny, Gaston (1889), "Etienne Mayneaud Bizefranc de Lavaux", Dictionnaire des parlementaires français de 1789 à 1889 (in French), Paris: Bourloton
- Tina Gaquer, "Etienne Mayneaud Bizefranc de Lavaux", Geneanet (in French)
