= Theatre de la Rue Saint Pierre =

Former theater in New Orleans, Louisiana

Coordinates: 29.95°N 90.07°W

Theatre de la Rue Saint Pierre or Le Spectacle de la Rue Saint Pierre, was the first (French-speaking) theatre in New Orleans in Louisiana, active in 1792-1810. It opened in 1792 and was known to the Spanish-speaking citizens as El Coliseo and to the French-speaking citizens, La Salle Comedie. It was described as a small building of native lumber near the center of the city. It was located on the uptown side of St. Peter Street between Royal and Bourbon Streets, in what is now called the French Quarter.

== History ==
=== Founding ===
In 1792, Parisians Jean-Louis Henry and Louis-Alexandre Henry purchased a piece of property measuring 64 feet by 128 feet from Louis McCarty.

=== Building ===
In a letter dated October 6, 1792, two days after the official opening of the theatre on October 4, Baron Joseph Delfau de Pontalba wrote to ex-Louisiana governor, Esteban Miró, the following description of the theater's interior:

"The theatre opened on October 4, Mr. de Carondelet's [Royal Governor of Louisiana, 1791-1797] saint's day. Two of the male actors are tolerable, the others bad; the actresses are fit to be run off [the stage] with a broom to their backs. The theatre is small, but quite pretty.... There are twelve loges [loggias] in the theatre which are all rented at $200 to $300 each per year, and they are reserved a month before the opening. The amphitheatre seats are 6 esaclins each, and the pit and gallery 4 each.

=== Activity ===
A professional French troupe began to perform in the city in the 1790s. The troupe was properly organized in 1794, and performed regularly at the theatre until 1800.

At least initially, the staff of the theatre consisted of professional actors led by Louis Tabary, singers and dancers from Saint-Domingue (Haiti), refugees of the Haitian Revolution, a group which became very populous in New Orleans at this time. While it is hard to verify from which theatre in Saint Domingue the actors came from, certain things give hints about their origin.

From 1793 its new director Madame Durosier announced her engagement of quadroon actresses at the theatre. Durosier was a name connected with the Comédie de Port-au-Prince (which was destroyed two years prior) a theatre which was known to employ quadroon actresses, among them the famous Minette et Lise, who may have been among those quadroon actresses employed at the Theatre de la Rue Saint Pierre. Durosier herself is no longer documented after 1797. Other noted artists were Joseph Destinval from Comédie de Port-au-Prince; Denis-Richard Dechanet Desassarts, who assisted in the re-organization of 1794; and Louis Champigny, who were otherwise a known hair dresser in New Orleans. The principal dancer Jean-Baptiste Francisquy, the two leading actors Jean Baptiste Le Sueur Fontaine and Jeanne-Marie Marsan, Mme. Delaure, Louis-Francois Clerville and the opera singer Mme. Clerville were all from the Comédie du Cap, which had been destroyed in 1793 during the Haitian revolution.

When the order of the theatre was established in the contract of 1797, there were fourteen actors employed at the theatre's troupe: Jeanne-Marie Marsan was among the actors granted benefit performances, and together with Clerville and Delaure, the highest-paid actor altogether with a salary of $70. The cast was made up mostly of refugees at least as late as 1804, and probably for its entire duration.

On 22 May 1796, the opera Silvain by André Grétry, became the first opera performed in New Orleans. In 1798, the stockholders of the theatre asked for and were granted a gambling permission to finance the theatre.

In 1800, an etiquette argument about reserved seats in the theater led to its closure, officially because the gambling concession was said to have been abused. It was opened again in 1802. In 1803, the theater was closed due to the bad condition of the building. In 1804, the building had been repaired, and the theatre was permitted to open again.

=== Closure ===
For a long time, Theatre de la Rue Saint Pierre was the only theater in New Orleans. However, in the face of competition from newer, larger theaters - Théâtre de Saint Philippe (1808) and later the Théâtre d'Orléans - the Theatre of St. Peter Street again went out of business, the building being auctioned off in 1810.

The theater burned down in the same 1816 fire which destroyed the first Théâtre d'Orléans.

== American premieres ==
- 1796: Silvain by André Grétry
- 1801: Il barbiere di Siviglia, ovvero La precauzione inutile by Giovanni Paisiello
- 1802: Le desert ou l’oasis by Joseph Arquier

== See also ==
- Théâtre d'Orléans
- French Opera House
- New Orleans Opera
- List of opera houses
