= Jean Baptiste Le Sueur Fontaine =

French actor

Jean Baptiste Fontaine, né Le Sueur (Paris, France 1745 – New Orleans, 5 July 1814), was a French actor and theatre director. He was director of the theatre Comédie du Cap in Cap-Francais and an actor and newspaper editor in New Orleans. He was known under his stage name Fontaine.

== Life ==
=== Early career ===
Born in Paris, he moved to Saint Domingue before 1775, where he was employed at the Comédie du Cap. In 1780, he succeeded Deforges as the director of the theatre in Cap-Français, and under his leadership, the theatre reached its greatest success, interrupted only after the Haitian Revolution.

In June 1793, he was one of the 10.000. refugees evacuated from Cap-Francais on American ships during the Great Fire and Pillage of Cap-Français. During the incident, most of the city was burnt and the white population took refuge in the ships of the harbour, and eyewitnesses describes scenes in which the rebels put on the costume from the Comédie du Cap.

=== New Orleans ===
In 1795, he was invited to New Orleans in Louisiana to be the director of the Theatre de la Rue Saint Pierre, where he became an actor. He continued as one of the most notable actors on the New Orleans theatre until his death. several of the other actors in the cast of the theatre was from Saint Domingue, such as Jeanne-Marie Marsan, Mme Clerville, Mme Delaure and Joseph Destinval.

In 1797–1811, he was the editor of Le Moniteur de la Louisiane.

=== Family ===
In 1775, Fontaine married his colleague Madame Le Prévost (born Marianne de Nonancour; 1741–1819), an actress and singer who after her debut in Brussels in 1757 was known in Paris (1766), Vienna (1768) and Copenhagen (1771) as Madame Du Bouchet. They separated in 1776, and she left Saint Domingue for France in 1785. In 1803, she came to live with him in New Orleans.
