= Macaya (military leader) =

Haitian military leader (fl. 1802)

Macaya (floruit 1802), was a Kongolese-born military leader known for leading smaller, decentralized bands of Africans forces during several battles during the Haitian Revolution. Enslaved in Saint-Domingue after being taken captive from the Kingdom of Kongo, he rose to prominence as a rebel commander during the 1791 slave uprising. He continued his leadership alongside another rebel commander named Perriot in 1793. Macaya is known to be one of the first to ally himself with the French Republican commissioners Sonthonax and Polverel. He played a key role in early revolutionary battles and helped lead forces that recaptured Cap-Français on behalf of the French Republicans in 1793.

== French Dependency ==
In 1793, a conflict developed between the French Republican commissioners, Sonthonax and Polverel, and the recently arrived French military governor, Francois-Thomas Galbaud du Fort over control of Cap-Français. When the commissioners went to the North and South Provinces to campaign against defiant whites, Galbaud began to implement his own ideas into the colony's main city. This caused tension between the commissioners and Galbuad. Sonthonax and Polverel planned to put him on board a warship, and to take himself back to France. But, the French sailors in the harbor supported Galbaud, and persuaded him to lead an assault on the city.

The commissioners eventually had Galbaud arrested and imprisoned on a ship in Le Cap's harbor. There, Galbaud was surrounded by other political prisoners and disaffected sailors who eventually convinced him to attempt a coup against the commissioners. Galbaud's supporters attacked Le Cap twice on two consecutive days. On the second day, they succeeded in taking control of the city. Sonthonax and Polverel were forced to take refuge outside the city.

== Macaya's Military Contributions ==
Pierrot's rebel forces were based in the hills outside of Le Cap (Cap Francaise), near Bréda plantation in 1793. There they began to seek support from the several-thoousand strong rebel forces nearby led by Pierrot and Macaya. French Republican commissioners, Sonthonax and Polverel called upon the black enslaved people of Cap-Français to join their side in order to defend themselves against Gabauld and his sailors. They promised freedom to the enslaved insurgents if they joined their forces. Macaya and Pierrot arrived in Haut du Cap, causing the Republican French commissioners to flee. The revolutionary commanders set up a camp with other insurgent groups, with their forces of about 2,000 men. With military aid from Spanish forces, Pierrot and Macaya's forces invaded Le Cap and defeated Galbaud's supporters, retaking the town for the Republicans. The combined forces of Spain and Pierrot and Macaya, were then sent back into the city of Cap-Français to drive back Galbaud and his forces.

In addition, during the Haitian Revolution, Macaya led independent bands of Kongolese soldiers in 1793. Many Kongolese enslaved in Saint-Domingue during the Haitian Revolution had prior military experience from civil wars in th Kingdom of Kongo prior to their enslavement. Toussaint Louverture, a Haitian general and revolutionary leader, led structured armies made of creole and mulatto leadership. During this period, Macaya also pledged loyalty to the Spanish Crown, fighting alongside other Black commanders who had aligned with Spain in the early years of the conflict.

After Toussaint Louverture rose to power, Macaya had a sometimes tense relationship with the colony's most powerful military leader. Louverture later ordered Macaya's imprisonment, though the specific circumstances remain unclear. Later on, however, in 1802, Macaya fought Leclerc's French army on behalf of Louverture. After most leading black generals in Saint-Domingue surrendered to the French or began to actively collaborate with them, Macaya continued to resist. His forces held the Limbé region in the colony's northern province. Macaya's rebel forces suffered serious losses at the hands of Haiti's future emperor, Dessalines, in early August 1802, when the latter was still fighting on behalf of the French.

== Emancipation and Abolition ==
In exchange for their military assistance, the insurgent commanders accepted the French Republican commissioners' offers of official recognition of their freedom and French citizenship. This marked the beginning of the Republican commissioners' escalating dependence on military support from former slaves, which ultimately helped to inspire the general emanicpation decrees in the colony. The commissioners' unilateral abolition of slavery in Saint-Domingue in 1793, in turn, was accepted by the French National Convention, and extended to the other French American colonies.

In an attempt to recruit the major rebel leaders to the French Republican side, the commissioners sent Macaya as an emissary to the two most powerful rebel slave commanders in the north, Biassou and Jean-Francois Papillon. At the time, these two leaders were allied with French royalists and Spain. But instead of convincing these two leaders to join the Republicans, Macaya himself defected to the royalist side. He issued a statement declaring his loyalty to the kings of France, Spain, and Kongo, whom he described as the descendants of the biblical magi. This statement said, " I am the subject of three kings: of the King of Congo, master of all the blacks; of the King of France who represents my father; of the King of Spain who represents my mother. These three Kings are the descendants of those who, led by a star, came to adore God made Man." Macaya may have been raised as a Catholic or exposed to Catholicism in Kongo, where Catholicism was adopted and blended into local cosmologies.

== Sources ==
- Robin Blackburn. The Overthrow of Colonial Slavery 1776–1848. London / New York: Verso, 2000.
- Laurent Dubois. The Avengers of the New World: The Story of the Haitian Revolution. Cambridge, Massachusetts / London, England: The Belknap Press of Harvard University Press.
  - Laurent Dubois and John D. Garrigus (editors). Slave Revolution in the Caribbean 1789–1804: A Brief History with Documents. Boston / New York: Bedford / St. Martin's, 2006.
- Jeremy D. Popkin. A Concise History of the Haitian Revolution (1st ed.) Chichester, West Sussex, UK: Blackwell Publishing Ltd.
- Alyssa Sepinwall. Haitian History New Persepctives, Routledge, New York. 2012.
- John K. Thornton. African Soldiers in the Haitian Revolution. Volume 25 Issue 1. Jan. 1991.
- Erin Zavitz. Revolutionary narrations: Early Haitian historiography and the challenge of writing counter-history. 2017.
