= Théâtre de Saint-Pierre =

Theater in Saint-Pierre, Martinique

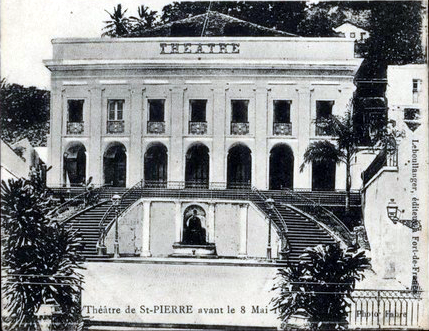
Théâtre de Saint-Pierre en 1900

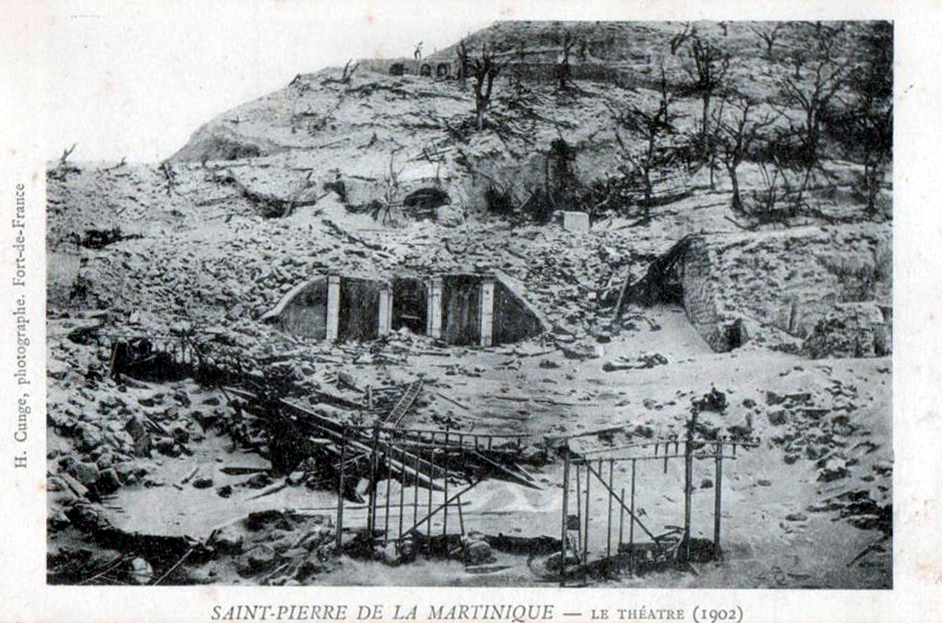
Théâtre de Saint-Pierre right after the 1902 eruption

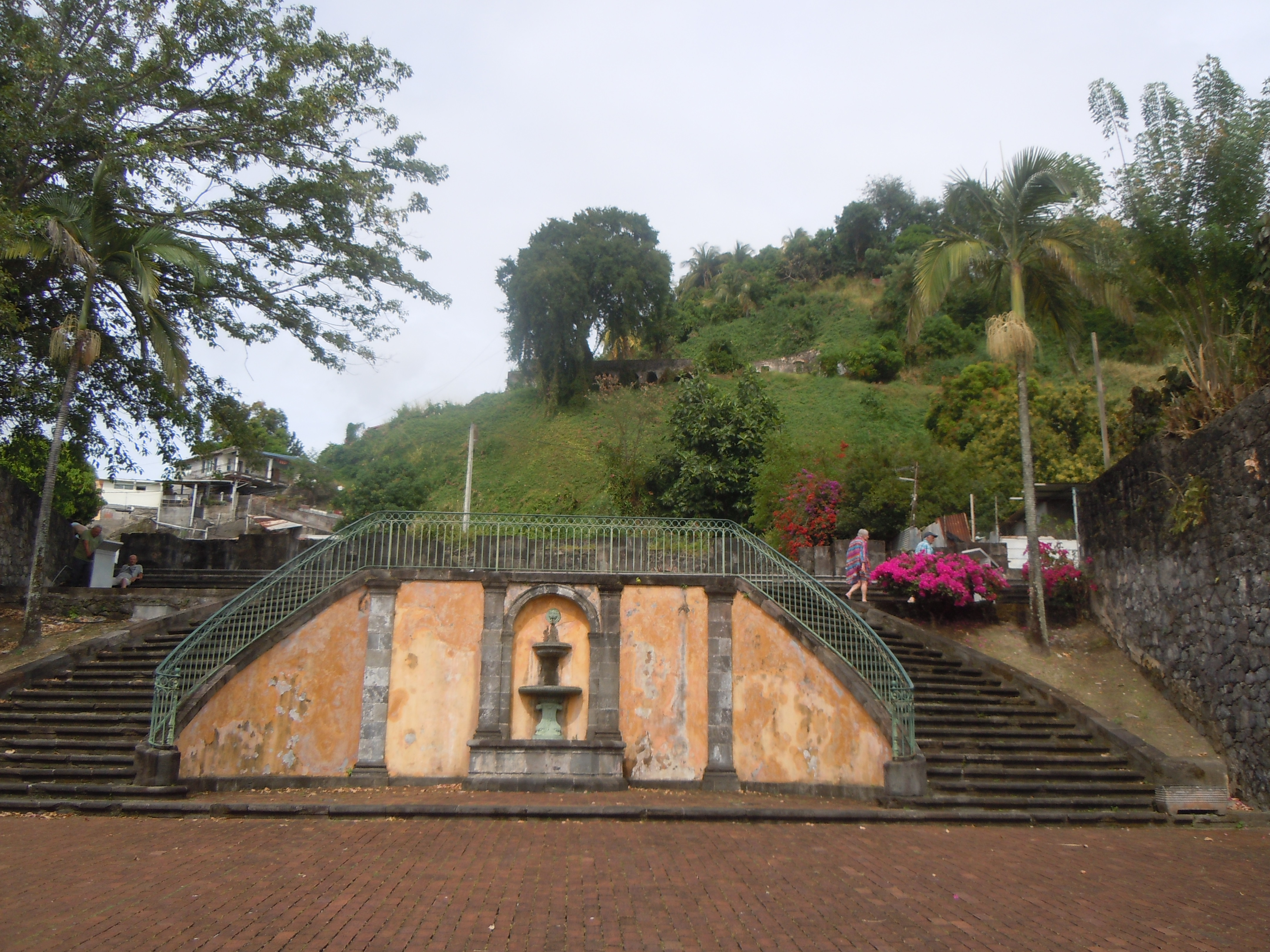
Ruins of the Théâtre in 2018

The Théâtre de Saint-Pierre, also known as La Comédie, was a theater in Saint-Pierre, Martinique, active from 1786 to 1902. It was a famous center of culture in the West Indies for over a century. Destroyed in the volcano eruption of 1902, its ruins became a historical monument and a site for tourists.

Originally, theatre companies from France performed in temporary localities on tours to Martinique. From 1780, there were demands to the authorities to provide the colony with a permanent theatre. At that point, there were already theatres in the cities of Saint-Domingue since the 1760s and two in Guadeloupe (in Basse-Terre and Pointe-a-Pitre), and a theatre was considered to be an essential hall mark of civilisation and sophistication. The building was designed inspired by the famous Theatre of Bordeaux, and had room for 800 seats. The theatre was described as extremely elaborate and elegant, and became famous in the Caribbean. In the facility, the latest drama, opera and ballets were performed by artists from France. The artists typically stayed no more than a few years or temporary until they continued to Saint-Domingue.

== See also ==
- Comédie du Cap
