= Marie de Cambolas =

Marie de Cambolas (1694-1757), was a French abbess. She was the founding abbess of the Communauté des Religieuses Filles de Notre-Dame du Cap-Français in Cap-Français in the French colony of Saint-Domingue in 1731-1757.

Marie de Cambolas was born in Toulouse as the daughter of François de Cambolas, a member of the Toulouse Parliament. She joined the Abbey of the Ordre des Religieuses de Notre-Dame in Toulouse in 1717. Reportedly, she had the calling of becoming a teacher, and wished to start a school for girls in Saint-Domingue. She herself successfully asked permission from the king to found a convent school in the colony, through the mediation of a Jesuit.

In November 1731, the future abbey of nuns of her order was formally founded in Cap-Français, and in 1733, she arrived in Cap-Français as the leader of a number of nuns to found the convent. During the first years, the convent struggled with insufficient buildings and tropical illness, but from 1740 onward, the convent was more securely established and functioned as a school and refuge for women guests.

Marie de Cambolas wished to include coloured girls in the school but this was initially refused. During the War of the Austrian Succession in 1744, British ships threatened Cap-Français. The danger was avoided, and the people of the city attributed this unexpected development to the prayers of Marie de Cambolas, and hailed her as the heroine of Cap-Français. After this, she was permitted to accept coloured pupils in the school.

Marie de Cambolas was described as an ascetic, who devoted herself heavily to penitent actions.
