= Jean-Jacques d'Esparbes =

French soldier

Governor of Saint-Domingue
- In office 18 September 1792 – 21 October 1792
- Preceded by: Adrien-Nicolas Piédefer, marquis de La Salle
- Succeeded by: Donatien-Marie-Joseph de Vimeur, vicomte de Rochambeau

Personal details
- Born: 12 January 1720
- Died: 13 March 1810 (aged 90)
- Occupation: Soldier

Jean-Jacques d'Esparbès (or Desparbès; 12 January 1720 – 13 March 1810) was a French soldier who was briefly Governor of Saint-Domingue in 1792 during the French Revolution.

== Life ==
Jean-Jacques d'Esparbès was born on 12 January 1720. He married a cousin of Madame de Pompadour. He was made maréchal de camp on 25 July 1762, and lieutenant general on 1 March 1780. He commanded the 20th Military Division at Montauban in July 1790.

D'Esparbès was appointed governor of Santo Domingo in 1792 and accompanied three new civil commissars to the island, Léger-Félicité Sonthonax, Étienne Polverel and Jean-Antoine Ailhaud. He was to replace governor Philibert François Rouxel de Blanchelande. The expedition included 6,000 soldiers. The future governor Étienne Maynaud de Bizefranc de Laveaux was lieutenant-colonel in command of a detachment of 200 men of the 16th regiment of dragoons. They reached Cap-Français (now Cap-Haïtien) on 18 September 1792.

The commissioners found that many of the white planters were hostile to the increasingly radical revolutionary movement and were joining the royalist opposition. The commissioners announced that they did not intend to abolish slavery, but had come to ensure that free men had equal rights whatever their color. D'Esparbes worked against the commissioners and became popular with the royalist planters. On 21 October 1792, the commissioners dismissed d'Esparbès and named the vicomte de Rochambeau governor general of Santo Domingo.

Both D'Esparbès and his predecessor Blanchelande were deported to France. D'Esparbès was accused of disloyalty on 4 February 1793, but was acquitted by the Revolutionary Tribunal on 27 April 1793 and withdrew from public life. He died on 13 March 1810.

== Work ==
Surviving writings by d'Esparbès include:

- Réponse de M. d'Esparbès,... aux articles insérés dans le Journal des amis de la constitution, du 4 janvier 1791, n°6, art. de Cahors..., 1791, p. 4
- Réponses du citoyen d'Esparbès à l'arrêté des commissaires nationaux civils envoyés aux Isles-sous-le-Vent, adressées à la Convention nationale, Paris: Impr. de Testu, p. 25
- Annonce des preuves et explications que le citoyen Desparbès se propose de fournir contre ses accusateurs, sur les faits, les préventions et les interprétations, Paris: Impr. de L. Potier de Lille, p. 12
- Réflexions du citoyen d'Esparbès sur les arrêts ordonnés à Cambefort, Paris: Impr. de Testu

== Sources ==
- Broughton, Tony (July 2006), "Generals Who Served in the French Army during the Period 1789 - 1814: Eberle to Exelmans", Napoleon Series
- Dubois, Laurent (30 June 2009), Avengers of the New World: The Story of the Haitian Revolution, Harvard University Press, ISBN 978-0-674-03436-5
- Gainot, Bernard (October–December 1989), "Le Général Laveaux Gouverneur de Saint-Domingue Député Néo-Jacobin", Annales historiques de la Révolution française, 278 (278), Armand Colin: 433–454, doi:10.3406/ahrf.1989.1281, JSTOR 41915691
- Jean-Jacques d' Esparbès (1720-1810) (in French), BnF: Bibliotheque nationale de France
- Klooster, Wim (23 January 2018), Revolutions in the Atlantic World, New Edition: A Comparative History, NYU Press, ISBN 978-1-4798-8240-3
- Popkin, Jeremy D. (15 February 2010), Facing Racial Revolution: Eyewitness Accounts of the Haitian Insurrection, University of Chicago Press, ISBN 978-0-226-67585-5
- Poublan, Danièle, Esparbès, Jean Jacques d' (1720-1810) (in French), Centre de recherches historiques EHESS
