= François-Thomas Galbaud du Fort =

French general

Governor of Saint-Domingue
- In office 7 May 1793 – 13 June 1793
- Preceded by: Léger-Félicité Sonthonax
- Succeeded by: Étienne Maynaud de Bizefranc de Laveaux

Personal details
- Born: 25 September 1743 Nantes, France
- Died: 21 April 1801 (aged 57) Cairo, Egypt
- Occupation: Soldier

François-Thomas Galbaud du Fort (or Dufort; 25 September 1743 – 21 April 1801) was a French general who was briefly governor-general of Saint-Domingue. He arrived at a time when the planters were hostile to the new French First Republic with its ideals of equality of all men, when many slaves had left the plantations and were fighting for freedom, and when the Spanish in neighboring Santo Domingo were at war with France. He started an uprising in the northern city of Cap-Français against the commissioners who represented the Republic. After violent clashes between white supporters of Galbaud and mulattoes and newly freed slaves who supported the commissioners he was forced to flee to the United States with many of the dissident planters and their families.

== Early years ==
François Thomas Galbaud du Fort was born on 25 September 1743 in Le Fort, Nantes. He was baptized in Notre Dame, Nantes, on 28 November 1743. His parents were François Galbaud Dufort and Agnès Dubreuil (1717–1793). His father was conseiller du roy maître ordinaire des comptes de Bretagne. He was one of four sons and six daughters. Galbaud became a pupil in the school of artillery in 1760, was made a lieutenant in 1762, captain in 1772. He was just 5 feet (1.5 m) tall. In 1775 he married Marie-Alexis Tobin de Saint-Aubin. His wife was a Creole whose family owned considerable property in Saint-Domingue. Their three sons all later entered the army.

Galbaud fought during the American Revolutionary War. After this he was stationed in the garrison at Strasbourg until the French Revolution of 1789. He was recommended for the cross of the Order of Saint Louis in 1788 on the basis of long service, the only decoration he received. He supported the revolution, and was one of the founders of the Jacobin club of Strasbourg in January 1790. Later he was in the Jacobin club in Metz. When he missed promotion in the spring of 1791 he complained of discrimination due to his revolutionary views.

Galbaud became a lieutenant-colonel in 1791. He was promoted by Louis XVI to maréchal de camp in 1792, the last promotion made by the king. In 1792 he served under General Charles François Dumouriez. Galbaud attempted to lead 1,500 troops to reinforce the Verdun garrison, but it surrendered before he arrived. However, he stopped the enemy in an action on the Biesme ridge, and participated in the Battle of Valmy on 20 September 1792. He was sent to negotiate a local armistice with the Prussian forces, and spoke with their commander the Duke of Brunswick, by his account giving a bold defense of France. Galbaud was noticed, and several influential proprietors of Saint-Domingue in Paris thought he would be a suitable governor for the colony.

Galbaud was appointed Governor General of the Windward Islands, then on 6 February 1793 this was changed to Governor General of Saint-Domingue in place of Jean-Jacques d'Esparbes. His mother, who owned property in Saint-Domingue, died a few days later, and Galbaud was a co-heir. Under the law of April 4th, 1792 this disqualified Galbaud from becoming governor. He informed the Minister of the Navy of the problem, but when he received no reply he left Brest at the start of April on the frigate Concorde and reached Cap-Français (Cap-Haïtien) on 7 May 1793.

== Saint-Domingue ==
Haiti, formerly Saint-Domingue. Cap-Français is now called Cap-Haïtien

Saint-Domingue was in turmoil at this time, since the white settlers were hostile to the civil commissioners Léger-Félicité Sonthonax and Étienne Polverel. Some of the whites wanted the monarchy restored. Meanwhile, slaves in the interior had revolted. General Étienne Maynaud de Bizefranc de Laveaux was trying with difficulty to keep the peace in Cap-Français in the north. Galbaud should have waited to be confirmed as governor by the civil commissioners, who were in Port-au-Prince. Instead he took an oath of office on the day of his arrival and made a speech that seemed to tell the white colonists that they could count on his support. On 8 May 1793 he wrote a letter to Polvérel and Sonthonax announcing his arrival, but did not forward dispatches from the government that gave them instructions on how to fight against Spain and Britain.

The commissioners arrived at Cap-Français on 10 June 1793, where they were welcomed by the colored people but received a cold reception from the whites. They heard that Galbaud was friendly with the faction that was hostile to the commission, and did not intend to obey the commissioners. Relations between Galbaud and the commissioners were extremely strained from the start. Galbaud would not accept the "citizens of 4 April" (Note: The decree of 4 April 1792 declared a state of emergency in Saint-Domingue and granted all free people in the colony full political rights, whatever the status of their parents.) into his entourage, or make "all the concubines of the city the social equals of his wife." Polvérel and Sonthonax asked Galbaud to resign, and when he refused they dismissed him on 12 June 1793. The commissioners interviewed Galbaud, who confirmed he would not obey their orders and could show that the obstacle of his property ownership had been waived. On 13 June 1793 Polvérel and Sonthonax proclaimed that they had dismissed Galbaud and ordered him to embark on the Normande, sail to France and give an account of his conduct to the National Convention. A long letter has been preserved that Galbaud wrote to the National Convention from prison protesting his arrest. The commissioners held a fete on 19 June 1793 to which they invited many free women of color, either married to men of color or whites.

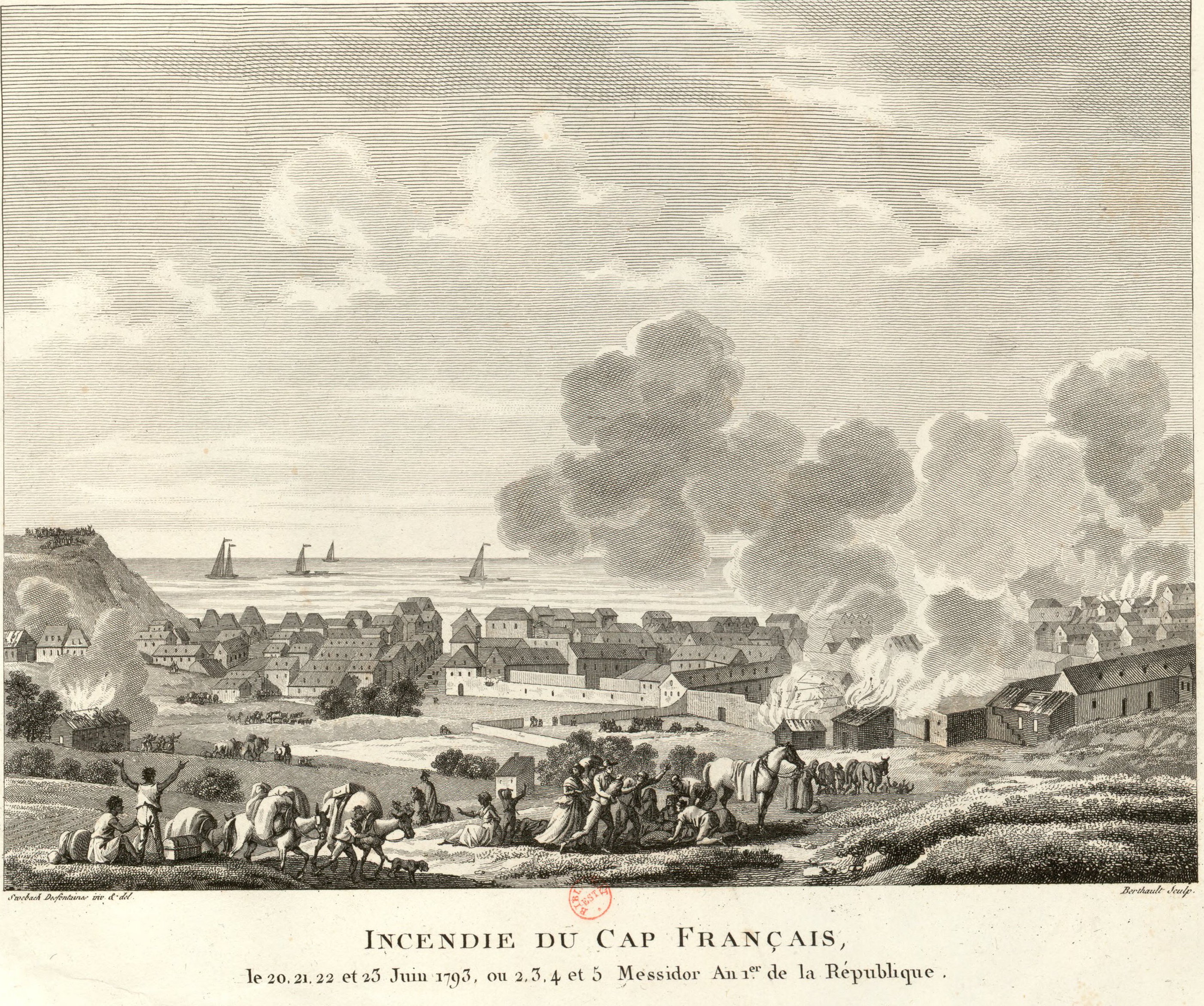
Cap-Français burning during the revolt

The white colonists stirred up the sailors of the fleet in the Cap-Français harbor against the commissioners. On the 20 June 1793 Galbaud proclaimed that he was resuming office and called for assistance in expelling the civil commissioners. He landed at 3:30 pm at the head of 3,000 men, who met no resistance at first. Colonel Antoine Chanlatte took command of the white and colored troops who had come to the aid of the commissioners. He was helped by Jean-Baptiste Belley, a free black who later became a member of the national convention. Street fighting ensued in which the supporters of the commissioners, although greatly outnumbered, gained the upper hand and captured Galbaud's brother and several naval officers. Fires broke out in the town. Galbaud retired with his force to the ships, but landed again at dawn on 21 June 1793 and captured the arsenal from its colored defenders.

The commissioners and colored men retreated to the strong point of Haut-du-Cap. The sailors and other whites began to loot the city, ignoring Galbaud's orders. They were joined by several hundred black insurgents whom the commissioners had freed but not armed, and who joined in the destruction along with the slaves resident in the town. The freed blacks and the city slaves, led by Pierrot, Macaya and Goa, came to understand that the commissioners were on their side. Directed by the mulattoes they attacked the sailors and the whites who had joined them. After a violent struggle the whites panicked and retreated to the ships, including Galbaud, but kept control of the arsenal.

The commissioners found themselves in an extremely difficult position, since they depended on the support of the black insurgents, and the Spanish were making attractive offers of emancipation if the slaves came over to their side. On 21 June 1793 they proclaimed that all blacks who would fight for them against the Spanish and other enemies would be given their freedom. (Note: Other sources give the date of the momentous proclamation giving freedom to slaves who fought for the Republic as 20 June 1793.) This policy revived an edict the king had issued in 1784 but that had not been implemented due to resistance from the planters. The proclamation of 21 June turned out to be the turning point in the struggle, and in the broader movement to emancipate the slaves. In a council of war on 22 June 1793 Galbaud decided to destroy the guns of all the batteries that could harm the fleet, thus destroying the city's defenses against a potential invasion by sea. It was then decided that the whole fleet would sail to the United States, and from there to France.

The freed insurgents joined the white and mulatto forces loyal to the commissioners and drove the sailors out of the arsenal and the city on 22–23 June. Most of Cap Francais had been burned down by 23 June 1793. Galbaud fled to Baltimore in a fleet of 120 ships carrying 10,000 refugees. The fleet left for the United States on 24–25 June. That night Rear Admiral Joseph de Cambis regained authority over the crew of the Jupiter, where Galbaud had taken refuge, and arrested Galbaud. However, soon after reaching the United States Galbaud managed to get the crew to again revolt against Cambis, who had to leave the ship and take refuge at the French consulate. The civil commissioners returned to Cap-Français on 4 July 1793, where they removed disloyal officials from office and replaced them by reliable men. On 10 July 1793 they wrote to the National Convention describing what had happened, and how Galbaud had left the northern province defenseless. Galbaud and his fellow "agitators" were accused of allying themselves "during the federalist period, with all of the colonists, or aristocratic and royalist merchants, in our principal commercial cities." On 29 August and 31 October 1793 Sonthonax and Polverel issued decrees that emancipated all slaves in the northern and southern provinces respectively.

== Later career ==
When Galbaud reached Paris in the spring of 1794 he was at once thrown into Abbaye prison under suspicion of being a royalist. His wife was active in working for his release, and he was given parole after eight months. He could not rejoin the French army, but found work in the office of the Committee of Public Safety. A month after Napoleon's coup of 18 Brumaire on 9 November 1799 he rejoined the army, and was sent to French-occupied Egypt accompanied by his wife. He arrived in Egypt in 1800 at the rank of brigadier-general. Galbaud died of the plague on 21 April 1801 in Cairo.

== Sources ==
- Ardouin, Beaubrun (1853), Étude sur l'histoire d'Haïti, vol. 2, Dezobry et E. Magdeleine, Lib.-éditeurs
- Clark, Emily (2013), The Strange History of the American Quadroon: Free Women of Color in the Revolutionary Atlantic World, UNC Press Books, ISBN 978-1-4696-0752-8
- Galbaud-Dufort, François-Thomas (1793), A la Convention nationale : de la maison d'arrêt de Lazare, l'an deuxième de la République une et indivisible, Paris: De l'Imprimerie patriotique de J.C. Laveaux, OCLC 265447145
- Geggus, David Patrick; Fiering, Norman (2009), The World of the Haitian Revolution, Indiana University Press, ISBN 978-0-253-22017-2
- Ghachem, Malick W. (5 March 2012), The Old Regime and the Haitian Revolution, Cambridge University Press, ISBN 978-0-521-83680-7
- Popkin, Jeremy D. (30 August 2010), You Are All Free: The Haitian Revolution and the Abolition of Slavery, Cambridge University Press, ISBN 978-0-521-51722-5
- Powell, Jim (24 June 2008), Greatest Emancipations: How the West Abolished Slavery, St. Martin's Publishing Group, ISBN 978-0-230-61298-3
- S.N.-T. (1875), "Insurrection de Saint-Domingue", Bulletin de la Société Archéologique de Nantes, 14, Nantes
- Vendée Militaire, "François Thomas Galbaud du Fort", Geneanet (in French)
