= Le Moniteur de la Louisiane =

Defunct newspaper in Louisiana

- "Bombalio, Clangor, Stridor, Taratantara, Murmur" (motto)
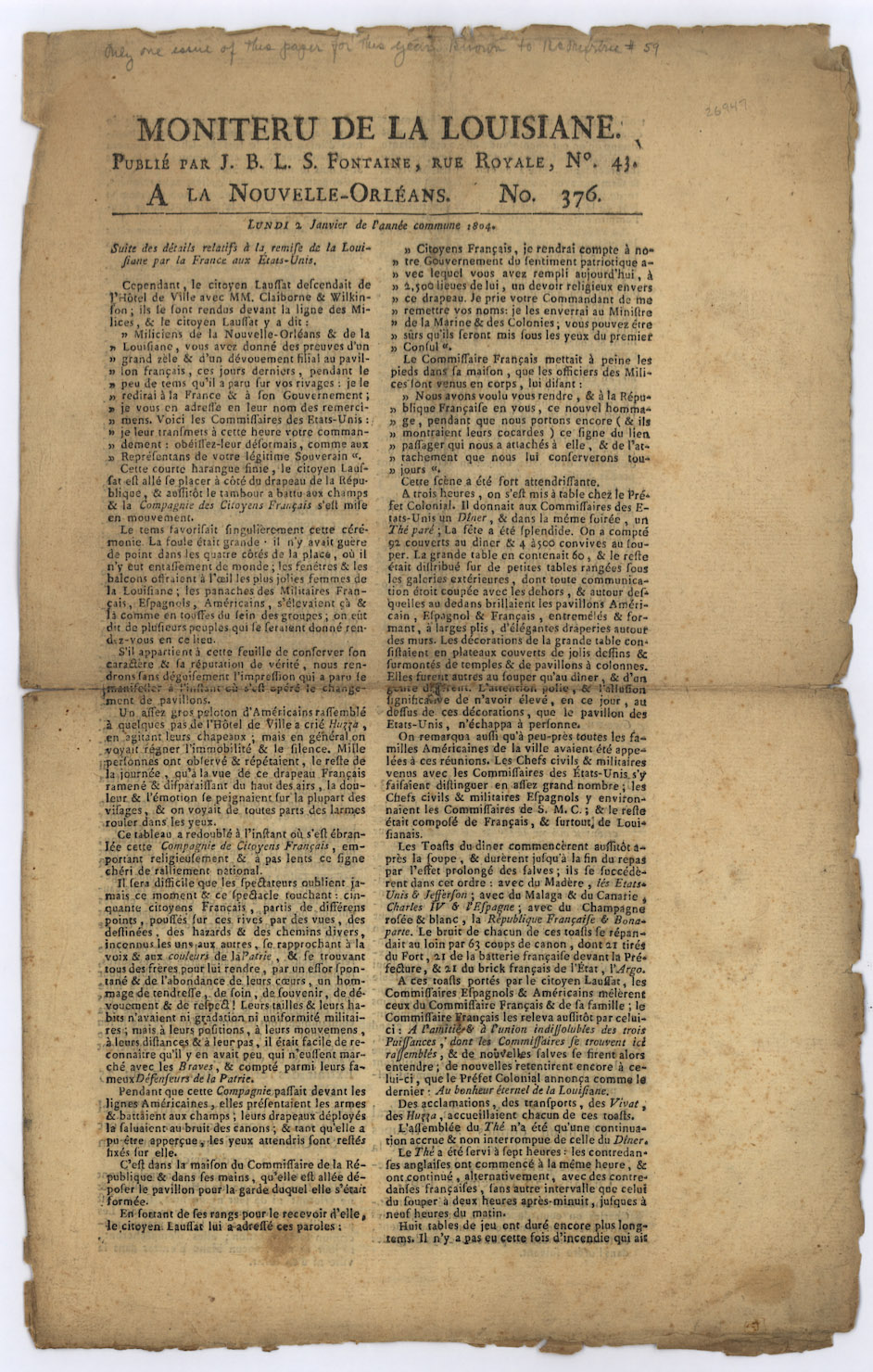
- First Page of the 2 January 1804 Edition
- Owner: W.H. Wilson
- Founder: Louis Duclot
- Editor: Jean Baptiste Leseur Fontaine
- Founded: 3 March 1794
- Ceased publication: 2 July 1814
- Language: French
- City: New Orleans, Louisiana, United States
- Readership: French people in Louisiana

Le Moniteur de la Louisiane (English: The Louisiana Monitor) was the first newspaper in Louisiana. It was published from 1794 to 1815 initially during a period of Spanish occupation of Louisiana to serve the French-speaking population of the region. The newspaper was written in the French language, typically in a four-page format.

== History ==
Le Moniteur de la Louisiane was first published in New Orleans on 3 March 1794 by Louis Duclot, the founder of the newspaper. Duclot was a refugee from Saint Domingue. The owner of the newspaper was W.H. Wilson of New Orleans. Initial publication required authorization by the Spanish colonial government, which was given by the governor, Francisco Luis Héctor de Carondelet. It was a weekly publication in the French language, reporting on local and international news, with an emphasis on international news.

Le Moniteur de la Louisiane became the official state newspaper in 1797. As such, the colonial government of the time used the newspaper to communicate government notices and regulations to the French-speaking population of the region. These communications included the policy on slavery. For a time, it communicated the policy on indemnification for runaway slaves resulting from slave revolts of the time. The newspaper ran advertisements of various sorts, emphasizing agricultural products and equipment and also sale of slaves.

Jean Baptiste Le Sueur Fontaine was the newspaper's editor from 1796 to 1814. He also served as publisher for a brief period. Like Duclot, Fontaine was also from Saint Domingue. While he was locally popular at the time because of his activities as an actor and socialite, Fontaine was a sympathizer to the French House of Bourbon, which may have influenced his editorial positions. Following Fontaine's tenure at the newspaper, Louis F. M. Le Faux became the editor.

The newspaper used the motto "Bombalio, Clangor, Stridor, Taratantara, Murmur". (Note: The motto may translate to "With gun, drum, trumpet, blunderbuss and thunder".) Nevertheless, the newspaper's policy was to avoid controversy, and it thereby seldom expressed editorial opinion.

Le Moniteur de la Louisiane ceased publication on 2 July 1814. (Note: Another source states that the newspaper folded in 1815.) A series of various other French-language or bilingual French – English newspapers came into existence in New Orleans and the Louisiana Territory. The French language newspaper Le Télégraphe began publication in New Orleans on 14 December 1803, and so its publication overlapped with that of Le Moniteur de la Louisiane.

While there is no complete collection of the issues of Le Moniteur de la Louisiane, various archives maintain selected editions of the newspaper, including the Library of Congress, the National Historical Archive (Spain), the New Orleans Cabildo, and the New Orleans City Hall Archive Room.

== See also ==
- L'Union, the first African-American newspaper in Louisiana
- L’Abeille de la Nouvelle-Orléans (English: The New Orleans Bee)
