= Jeanne-Marie Marsan =

American actress

Jeanne-Marie Marsan, born Chapiseau (1746 – 25 February 1807), was a French dramatic actress and an opera singer, active in France, the Holy Roman Empire, the French West Indies and Louisiana. She was the leading actress and opera singer in Saint-Domingue (pre-revolutionary Haiti), and later in the first theatre in New Orleans in Louisiana.

== Biography ==
Born in the Faubourg Saint-Germain of Paris, she married the actor Pierre Legendre Marsan, who was forced to flee from France to Martinique in 1765. Jeanne-Marie stayed in France and during the following ten years made herself famous on the stages of Paris, the French provinces, and Germany before travelling with her children to join her husband in Martinique in 1775, where she made a successful debut on the stage of the theatre in Saint-Pierre.

=== Saint Domingue ===
In 1780, Marsan and her family moved to Haiti, where she was hired at the Cap-Français theatre and became the leading actress and singer in the colony. She was renowned for her versatility, performing in tragedy, comedy, spoken drama and opera. A letter that appeared in a Port-au-Prince newspaper on 10 March 1787 praised her performance in the role of "Nina":

It is said that Mme. Dugazon's performance of this role is actually terrifying, and that she spent several months in the insane asylums in Paris in order to study it. . .Mme. Marsan, at the Cap. . .played this role before my eyes in such a lifelike manner that it actually made me suffer. Permit me, Sir, to take advantage of this opportunity to do homage to that adorable actress. If she were at the Théâtre Italien, her name would be as famous as that of Dugazon, the elder Sainval, Contat, and others like them; for Mme. Marsan possesses in an eminent degree the talent for high comedy and for comic opera. Let anyone try to name an actress who can, like her, play in a single night, and with such perfection, "Elmire" in Tartuffe and the title role in La Servante Maîtresse, "Babet" and the "Gouvernante," "Rosalie" in Jenneval and "Clémentine" in Le Magnifique.

In June 1793, Marsan was likely among the 10.000. refugees evacuated from Cap-Francais on American ships during the Great Fire and Pillage of Cap-Français. During the incident, most of the city was burnt and the white population took refuge in the ships of the harbour, and eyewitnesses describes scenes in which the rebels put on the costume from the Comédie du Cap. Many of the actor of the theatre were to have been in New Orleans in 1794.

=== New Orleans ===
In the 1795–96 season, Marsan is confirmed to have been in New Orleans as the leading actress and singer of the Théâtre de la Rue Saint Pierre in New Orleans. Marsan is believed to have sung the principal female part in Silvain – reputed to be the first opera ever performed in New Orleans – on 22 May 1796. She was already famous for this role in Haiti. When the order of the theatre was established in the contract of 1797, she was among the actors granted benefit performances, and together with Clerville and Delaure, the highest-paid actor altogether with a salary of §70.

When the theatre was closed in 1800, Marsan retired from the stage and lived on the income from a property bought for her by the actor Jean Baptiste Le Sueur Fontaine, director of the New Orleans theatre and previously director of the Cap-Francais theatre, where she was earlier employed.

She died in New Orleans in 1807.
