= Madame Acquaire =

French actress and theatre director

Madame Acquaire also known as Mlle Babet (d. after 1786), was a French stage actress and theatre director, active in Saint-Domingue.

== Career ==
Mme Acquaire was known under the name Mlle Babet in her early career. During the 1770s, she was active as an actress and director in Petit-Goave. Petit-Goave did not possess an actual theatre, but theatrical and musical performances was immensely popular in Saint-Domingue and an important part of the colony's social life, and theatrical and musical performances was staged by local amateurs assisted by professional actors. Babet functioned as the professional director and instructor of the performances at Petit-Goave, an unusual position for a woman. In Saint-Domingue, however, several women are known for their influence within the theatre world, such as Mlle Marthe, director of the theatre of St Marc (1769), and Madame Case, co-director with her spouse of the theatre in Les Cayes (1785).

On June 18, 1777, the Affiches Americaines announced that Beaumarchais' Barbier de Sevilla and l'Braeur d'un moment, a one-act opera by Monvel, would be performed to the benefit of Mlle Babet, staged by the local amateur theatre society, prior to her departure from her position as director after her marriage to the actor 'Monsieur Acquaire', with whom she was engaged at the Comédie de Port-au-Prince after its foundation in 1778.

Madame Acquaire came to have an influential position in the theatre of the colonial capital, where her spouse eventually became director (1784). She belonged to the star attractions of the theatre and performed as a singer as well as an actress in both theatre and opera, playing roles within the category of tragic heroines, a category with high status in that period. She wielded an important influence within cultural life in Saint-Domingue, and played a significant part in introducing colored actors on stage in colonial theatre by recruiting colored actors to the theatre. She is known for having recruited the colored Minette et Lise, who she gave lessons in voice and stage presence and successfully introduced to the stage in 1780.

Mme Acquaire left Saint-Domingue for France in 1786, and was joined by her spouse five years later, after the outbreak of the Haitian Revolution of 1791.

== Cultural references ==
She is portrayed in a novel about Minette et Lise by Marie Chauvet, La Danse sur le Volcan (Paris: Plon, 1957; Paris / Léchelle: Maisonneuve & Larose / Emina Soleil, 2004 (reprint with a preface by Catherine Hermary-Vieille); Léchelle: Zellige, 2008, 2009)[3] Translated into English by Salvator Attanasio as Dance on the Volcano (New York: William Sloane Associates, 1959)
