= Communauté des Religieuses Filles de Notre-Dame du Cap-Français =

Convent in Cap-Français, Haiti

Communauté des Religieuses Filles de Notre-Dame du Cap-Français was a convent in Cap-Français in Saint-Domingue, active from 1731 to 1793. It was a public institution which functioned as a refuge for women and a school for girls, presumable the only such institution in the colony.

The convent was founded in November 1731 by the order of Mère Jeanne Lestonnac from Bordeaux in France: the order had connections to the Jesuits, and the members in the colony were referred to as jesuitine. They wore a black habit.

The convent had an obligation to give refuge to every female in need, usually separated and divorced women. During the 1780s, it housed 18 nuns and novices, and 40-50 female guests. The convent also housed the only confirmed school for girls in the colony, which offered reading, writing and arithmetic. In accordance with the wishes of the abbess Marie de Cambolas (1697-1757), it accepted students of all races. Shortly before the Haitian Revolution in 1791, there was a report that several of its students had been enrolled by the student "Princess Amethyst" in the voodoo religion.

The convent was likely destroyed during the Pillage of Cap-Français in 20-26 June 1793, when most of the city was burnt and the white population took refuge in the ships of the harbour and departed with them.
