= Comédie de Port-au-Prince =

Theater in Port-au-Prince in Saint-Domingue

The Comédie de Port-au-Prince, also called Salle Mesplés, was a theater in Port-au-Prince in Saint-Domingue, active from 1778 to 1791.

== Foundation ==
The city of Port-au-Prince had been founded as the official capital of the colony in 1750. At this point, theater and music was immensely popular in the colony and frequented by most free people of all races and classes, and public theaters existed in not only Cap-Francais but also in smaller towns such as the theaters of Mlle Marthe and Mlle Francheville in Saint-Marc (1769–1802), Monsieur Passete in Leogane (1760s) and Monsieur Charpentier in Les Cayes (1765–88), and it was considered necessary to have one in the new capital city.

In 1762, a first theater was managed by the three joint-directors Rouzier, Claude Clement and Charpentier, but it did not last. A permanent theater was finally established by the theater director Francois Mesplete (d. 1784), who founded the Comédie de Port-au-Prince in 1778.

== Activity ==
It was a playhouse with room for 750 people. The theater offered regular performances of drama, opera and music concerts until the Haitian Revolution of 1791, and became an important cultural center.

The theater employed a stock company of eight actors, eight actresses, eleven musicians, a prompter, a stage manager, a decorator, a tailor, a hairdresser, four porters and a clerk. Francois Mesplete was succeeded in 1784 by Monsieur Acquaire, whose wife the singer-actress Madame Acquaire (previously Mlle Babet) had been a director of the local amateur theater in Gonaive, are known as the mentor of the famous Minette et Lise. Another star attraction of the theater was the violinist Monsieur Petit.

== Destruction ==
After the outbreak of the Haitian Revolution, Acquaire resigned his position as director to Monsieur Blainville and joined his wife in France. Blainville attempted to use the theater as a venue to reconcile the tensions of the colony during the revolution, an attempt which was well received, as the activity of the theater was reportedly in full operation right up until the night of the 22 November 1791, when Port-au-Prince was attacked and burnt, during which the theater was among the buildings destroyed.

== See also ==
- Comédie du Cap
