= Cormatin =

- Commune
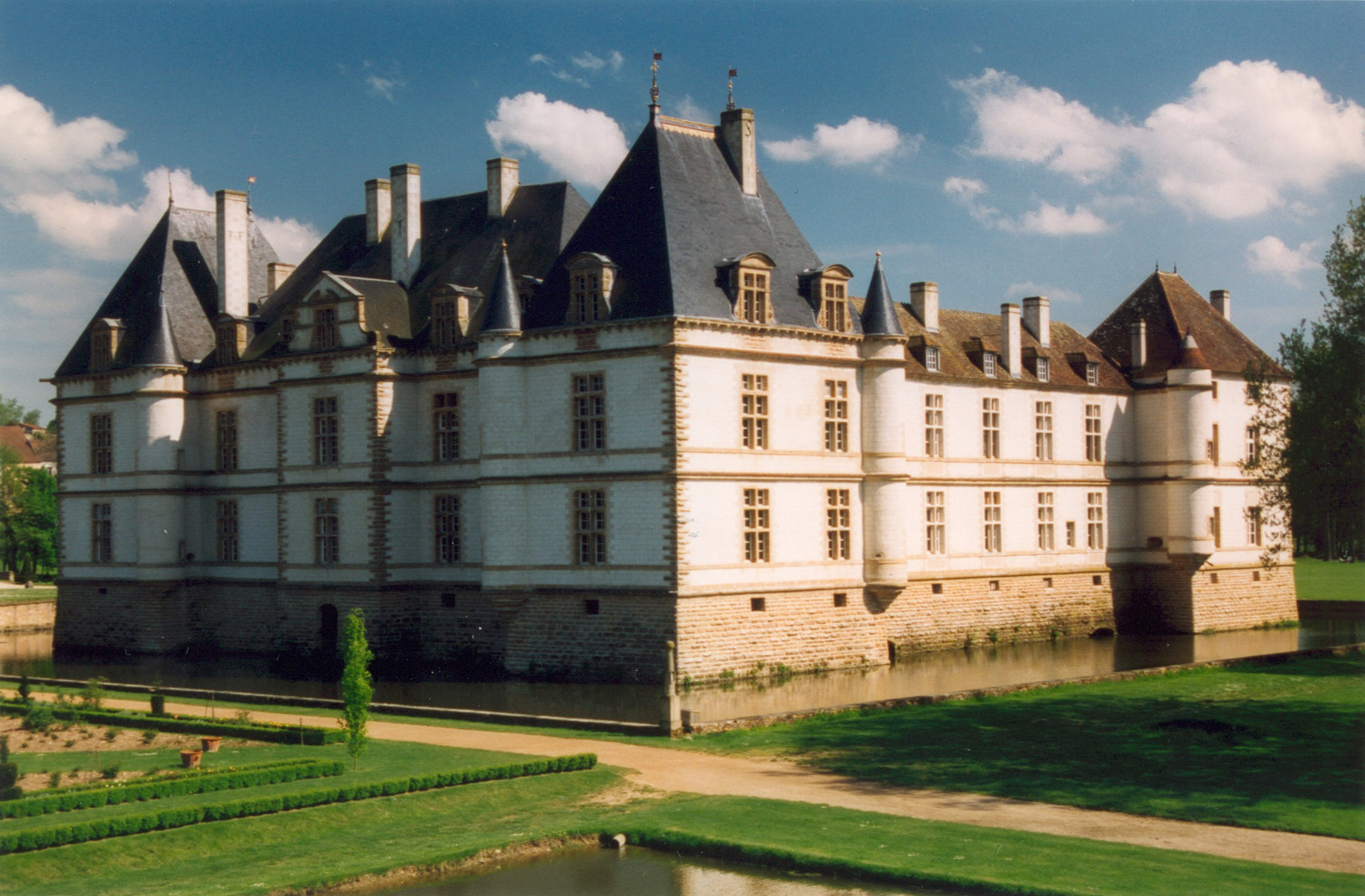
- Château de Cormatin

- Coat of arms
- Location of Cormatin
- Location within France Location within Bourgogne-Franche-Comté
- Coordinates: 46°32′45″N 4°41′15″E
- Country: France
- Region: Bourgogne-Franche-Comté
- Department: Saône-et-Loire
- Arrondissement: Chalon-sur-Saône
- Canton: Cluny

Government
  - Mayor (2020–2026): Jean-François Bordet
- Area^{1}: 9.17 km^{2} (3.54 sq mi)
- Elevation: 218 m (715 ft)
- Highest elevation: 260 m (850 ft)
- Lowest elevation: 201 m (659 ft)
- Population (2023): 569
  - Density: 62.1/km^{2} (161/sq mi)
- Time zone: UTC+01:00 (CET)
  - Summer (DST): UTC+02:00 (CEST)
- INSEE/Postal code: 71145 /71460
- ^{1} French Land Register data, which excludes lakes, ponds, glaciers > 1 km^{2} (0.386 sq mi or 247 acres) and river estuaries.

Cormatin (French pronunciation: [kɔʁmatɛ̃]) is a commune in the Saône-et-Loire department in the region of Bourgogne-Franche-Comté in eastern France.

The village, on the river Grosne, is home to the Château de Cormatin.

== Geography ==
The Grosne forms part of the commune's south-western border, then flows northward through the western part of the commune.

== See also ==
- Communes of the Saône-et-Loire department
