= Macaya (surname) =

Macaya is a Spanish surname. Notable people with the surname include:

- Alfonso Macaya (1878–1950), Spanish football executive and businessman
- Camila Macaya (born 1990), Chilean badminton player
- Enrique Macaya Márquez (born 1934), Argentine sports journalist
- Ignacio Macaya (1933–2006), Spanish field hockey player
- Javier Macaya (born 1978), Chilean lawyer and politician
- Román Macaya, Costa Rican scientist, entrepreneur, diplomat, and public servant
