= Léger-Félicité Sonthonax =

French politician and colonial administrator (1763–1813)

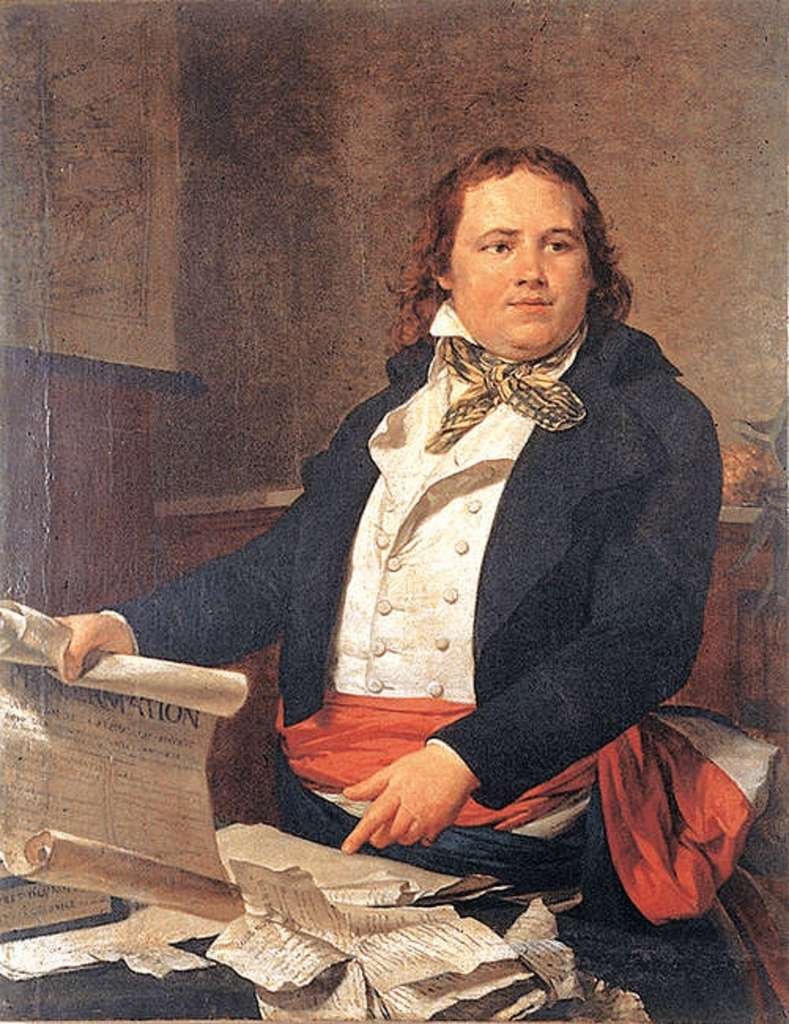
- Late 18th-century oil painting portrait of Sonthonax

Commissioner of Saint-Domingue (North)
- In office 18 September 1792 – 24 August 1797

Governor of Saint-Domingue
- In office 2 January 1793 – 7 May 1793
- Preceded by: Vicomte de Rochambeau
- Succeeded by: François-Thomas Galbaud du Fort
- In office 11 May 1796 – 24 August 1797
- Preceded by: Étienne Maynaud de Bizefranc de Laveaux
- Succeeded by: Toussaint Louverture

Deputy in the Council of Five Hundred
- In office 14 October 1795 – 19 May 1799
- Constituency: Saint-Domingue

Personal details
- Born: March 7, 1763 Oyonnax, France
- Died: July 23, 1813 (aged 50) Oyonnax, France
- Occupation: Abolitionist

Léger-Félicité Sonthonax (7 March 1763 – 23 July 1813) was a French politician and colonial administrator. He was a Jacobin before joining the Girondins, which emerged in 1791. During the Haitian Revolution, he controlled 7,000 French troops in Saint-Domingue. His official title was Civil Commissioner. From September 1792, he and Polverel became the de facto rulers of Saint-Domingue's non-slave population. Because they were associated with Brissot’s party, they were put in accusation by the convention on July 16, 1793, but a ship to bring them back in France didn’t arrive in the colony until June 1794, and they arrived in France in the time of the downfall of Robespierre. They had a fair trial in 1795 and were acquitted of the charges the white colonists brought against them.

Sonthonax believed that Saint-Domingue's whites were royalists or separatists, so he attacked the military power of the white settlers and by doing so alienated the colonial settlers from their government. Many gens de couleur (mixed-race residents of the colony) asserted that they could form the military backbone of Saint-Domingue if they were given rights, but Sonthonax rejected this view as outdated in the wake of the August 1791 slave uprising. He believed that Saint-Domingue would need ex-slave soldiers among the ranks of the colonial army if it was to survive. In August 1793, he proclaimed freedom for all slaves in the north province. Historians have debated his motives for abolishing slavery, with some arguing that he was influenced by revolutionary ideals of equality, and others alleging that he was forced into ending slavery in order to maintain his own power.

== Early life ==
Born in Oyonnax, France on March 7, 1763, the son of a prosperous merchant, Sonthonax was a lawyer in the Parlement of Paris who rose in the ranks during the French Revolution. Sonthonax's wealth was due to his father's business, which employed many people from the region, and had made his father the richest man of the village. Sonthonax finished his studies at the University of Dijon, becoming a well-known lawyer with the help of his wealthy father. A member of the Society of the Friends of the Blacks, he became connected with Jacques Pierre Brissot and subsequently aligned himself with the Girondists. These connections would influence his later role in the colonies.

== Mission ==
In August 1791, a slave rebellion (the Haitian Revolution) broke out in the northern part of Saint-Domingue, the heart of the island's sugar plantation economy. Saint-Domingue was also wracked by conflict between the white colonists and free people of colour (many of whom were of mixed race), and also between those supportive of the French Revolution and those for a re-establishment of the Ancien Régime — or failing that, for Saint-Domingue's independence.

In 1792, Léger-Félicité Sonthonax, Étienne Polverel and Jean-Antoine Ailhaud were sent to the colony of Saint-Domingue (now Haïti) as part of the First Civil Commission. They were accompanied by Jean-Jacques d'Esparbes, who had been appointed governor of Saint-Domingue. He was to replace governor Philibert François Rouxel de Blanchelande. The expedition included 6,000 soldiers. The commissioners found that many of the white planters were hostile to the increasingly radical revolutionary movement and were joining the royalist opposition. They announced that they did not intend to abolish slavery, but had come to ensure that free men had equal rights whatever their color. D'Esparbes worked against the commissioners and became popular with the royalist planters. On 21 October 1792, the commissioners dismissed d'Esparbès and named the vicomte de Rochambeau governor general of Saint-Domingue.

Their main goal was to maintain French control of Saint-Domingue and enforce the social equality recently granted to free gens de couleur by the French National Convention as part of the decree of 4 April 1792. The legislation re-established French control of Saint-Domingue, granted full citizenship and political equality to free male blacks and free male mulattoes, but did not emancipate the slaves. Instead, he was tasked to defeat slave rebellions and induce the slaves to return to the plantations. Sonthonax had initially decried the abolition of slavery to gain the support of the whites on the island. Upon his arrival, he found that some whites and free people of color were already cooperating against the slave rebels. He did exile many radical whites who would not accept free coloreds as equals and managed to contain the slave insurgency outside of the North.

Sonthonax and Polverel were sent to Saint-Domingue, as they proclaimed when they arrived, not to abolish slavery, but to maintain order and give equality of rights to the free men, regardless of the color of their skin, granted to them by the decree of April 4, 1792. But ultimately, all slaves in the north province were granted freedom on August 29, 1793, by Sonthonax, and in the west and south provinces, from August 27 to October 31 1793, by Polverel. Following the proclamation, Sonthonax wrote a reply to those that were opposed to his and Polverel's decision in 1793 to grant these select slaves this new freedom. He declares his never ending belief that civil rights should be granted to these Africans and defends his decision to free the slaves was not erroneous to do. Sonthonax's Proclamation Au nom de la République explained his role in the Revolution. He was committed to make drastic decisions to prevent Britain and Spain from succeeding in their attempts to assume control over Saint-Domingue.

== Emancipation and conflict ==
In February 1793, France declared war on Great Britain, which presented a new problem for Sonthonax. All those he had alienated in trying to uphold the French Revolution in Saint-Domingue proceeded to try and flee to the British West Indies (primarily Jamaica), where the colonial authorities gave shelter to the French counter-revolutionary émigrés. The white population in the colony declined significantly until only 6,000 remained after June 1793.

On June 20, 1793, a failed attempt to take control of the capital by a new military governor sympathetic to whites, François-Thomas Galbaud, led to the bombardment and burning of Cap-Français (now Cap-Haïtien). The burning was likely done by the roughly 1,000 non-native sailors among Galbaud's forces. Sonthonax made General Étienne Laveaux governor and expelled Galbaud from the colony after a promise of freedom for ex-slaves who agreed to fight on behalf of the commissioners and the French republican regime they represented. Up to this point, the commissioners had still been pursuing the fight against the black slaves, whose insurrection had begun in August 1791. Their emancipation was a momentous victory for all slave forces, and oral histories suggest a boost in their morale. On June 24, 1793, 60% of the white population left Saint-Domingue with Galbaud, most never to return. On August 29, 1793, with rumors of emancipation rampant, Sonthonax took the radical step of proclaiming the freedom of the slaves in the north province (with severe limits on their freedom). From August 27 to October 31, 1793, on his side, Polverel emancipated the slaves in the west and south provinces.

It was during this time, and due to the new trend of conceding rights to blacks, that Toussaint Louverture began reforming his political philosophy to embrace France rather than Spain; however, he was cautious and awaited French ratification of emancipation before officially changing sides. On February 4, 1794, the French National Convention ratified this act, applying it to all French colonies, including Guadeloupe. Due to the fact that they were under a decree of accusation, on that day, Sonthonax and Polverel’s names were not pronounced in the convention, not even by Dufay, the deputy of Saint-Domingue sent by Sonthonax to explain to the deputies of the convention why slavery had been abolished in the colony.

The enslaved population of Saint-Domingue did not flock to Sonthonax's side as he had anticipated, while white planters continued to resist him. They were joined by many of the free men of color who opposed the abolition of slavery in the colony, many of them being planters themselves. It was not until word of the ratification of emancipation by the French government arrived back in the colony that Toussaint Louverture and his corps of well-disciplined, battle-hardened former slaves came over to the French Republican side in early May 1794.

A change in the political winds back home caused Sonthonax to be recalled to France to defend his actions. Upon his arrival in the summer of 1794, he argued that the free people of colour, whom he had been originally sent to defend, were no longer loyal to France, and that the Republic should place its faith in the freed slaves. Vindicated, Sonthonax returned to Saint-Domingue a second time. The Comte d'Hédouville was sent by France to be governor of the island, but was eventually forced to flee.

== Return to France ==
Toussaint, in the meantime, was consolidating his own position. The black general arranged for Sonthonax to leave Saint-Domingue as one of its elected representatives in 1797. When Sonthonax showed himself to be hesitant, Toussaint placed him under armed escort onto a ship bound for France on August 24. In France, he continued to participate in political life as a deputy, and remained involved in debates over colonial policy and the future of slavery in the French Republic. He died of natural causes in his home town of Oyonnax on July 23, 1813, after sixteen years back in France.

== Bibliography ==
- 1793 – Proclamation nous, Étienne Polverel & Léger Félicité Sonthonax, commissaires civils, que nation française voyé dans pays-ci, pour mettre l'ordre et la tranquillité tout par-tout
- 1793 – Proclamation. Au nom de la République. : Nous Léger-Félicité Sonthonax, commissaire civil de la République, délégué aux Iles françaises de l'Amérique sous le vent, pour y rétablir l'ordre & la tranquillité publique
- 1793 – Copies des lettres écrites au Ministre de la Marine, par le citoyen Santhonax, commissaire civil délégué à St Domingue, en date du Cap-Français, le 11 février 1793, l'an I de la République
- 1793 – Sonthonax, commissaire-civil de la République française à Saint-Domingue a la société des amis de la liberté & de l'égalité ...
- 1798 – Motion d'ordre faite par Sonthonax, sur la résolution du 27 thermidor dernier, relative aux domaines engagés
- 1799 – Sonthonax, représentant du peuple, à ses collègues du Corps législatif

== Sources ==
- Dubois, Laurent (2009), Avengers of the New World: The Story of the Haitian Revolution, Harvard University Press, ISBN 978-0-674-03436-5
- Klooster, Wim (2018), Revolutions in the Atlantic World, New Edition: A Comparative History, NYU Press, ISBN 978-1-4798-8240-3
- Popkin, Jeremy D. (2010), Facing Racial Revolution: Eyewitness Accounts of the Haitian Insurrection, University of Chicago Press, ISBN 978-0-226-67585-5
- Poublan, Danièle, Esparbès, Jean Jacques d' (1720–1810) (in French), Centre de recherches historiques EHESS
