= Comédie du Cap =

Theater in Cap-Français in Saint-Domingue

Comédie du Cap was a theater in Cap-Français in Saint-Domingue, active from 1740 to 1793; from 1764 as a public theater. It is regarded as a prototype for the theaters in Saint-Domingue, where theater was immensely popular.

== History ==
=== Foundation ===
The Comédie du Cap was opened in 1740 as a private theater at Rue Vaudreuil, were amateur theater were performed for only the Grand Blanc planter aristocracy personally acquainted to the amateur actors.

In 1764, it became a public institution, and a new building was inaugurated in 1765. This was the result of the wish of the government of France to show favor to their Caribbean colonies after their loss of French Canada during the Seven Years' War, and the theater was given great government support as a tool for representation of the French crown: in 1775, it was given direct financial support from the government during a period of economic crisis.

=== The building ===
The new building from 1766 was erected on the square Place de Montarcher opposite the Governor's residence. The theater had seats for 1500 people, and a staff of twelve male and eight female actors. The exterior was not dissimilar from the other buildings around the square, except for the two balconies over the entrance, which belonged to the boxes of the governor and the military intendent of the colony. The interior was decorated in blue and gold, with a proscenium of two sculptured satyrs on each side of the French Lilly.

=== Activity ===
Theater was very popular in the colony, and the Comedie du Cap was one of the city's most prominent places of social life. It hosted about 2000 plays, operas and concerts each year, and public balls twice a weeks, and it was also rented for private functions. As it was regularly visited by the same people, it was necessary to continually offer new performances, and the theater had a good reputation of offering the latest plays from Paris.

Because of its remoteness and the bad reputation of the Caribbean colonies in 18th-century France, it was difficult to engage performers from France: it was therefore necessary to offer very high salaries to the professional performers engaged from France, but they were normally not willing to stay long. It was however quite common for actors from France to tour in the colonies; the most famed occasion being the Parisian star Louis-Francois Ribie, who performed with a troupe composed of Parisian actors in Saint Domingue and Martinique in 1787–88 and 1791.

Initially closed for non-whites, it opened for all races in 1775, though the seats were segregated: the racial organisation of the theater has been referred to as a representation of the racial segregation of the entire colony. The theater was very popular among all classes, and also affordable for most.

=== Destruction and legacy ===
The Comédie du Cap was likely destroyed during the Great Fire and Pillage of Cap-Français in 20–26 June 1793. During the incident, most of the city was burnt and the white population took refuge in the ships of the harbour, and eyewitnesses describes scenes in which the rebels put on the costume from the Comédie du Cap.

Several of the artists became a part of the Dominguan refugees to the United States and contributed to the artistic life: the principal dancer Jean-Baptiste Francisquy, Jean Baptiste Le Sueur Fontaine (director in 1780–1793) and Jeanne-Marie Marsan, Mme. Delaure, Louis-Francois Clerville and the opera singer Mme. Clerville, who all became a part of the Theatre de la Rue Saint Pierre of New Orleans, all came from the Comédie du Cap.

== See also ==
- Comédie de Port-au-Prince
