= Étienne Polverel =

French lawyer, aristocrat and revolutionary

- Born: 1740; Bearn
- Died: 1795 (aged 54–55)
- Occupations: Lawyer, aristocrat, and revolutionary
- Known for: Sent to Saint-Domingue to suppress a slave revolt

Étienne Polverel (1740–1795) was a French lawyer, aristocrat, and revolutionary. He was a member of the Jacobin club. In 1792, he and Léger Félicité Sonthonax were sent to Saint-Domingue to suppress the slave revolt and to implement the decree of 4 April 1792, that gave equality of rights to all free men, regardless of their color.

Although Polverel and Sonthonax were abolitionists, they had no intention of abolishing slavery when they arrived in September in the colony, and they had not received the right to do so. To preserve the colony for France, however, they were forced to give freedom to the Blacks slaves who would fight on their side. Under pressure, between 27 August and 31 October 1793, they progressively gave freedom to all the slaves of Saint-Domingue.

Being from Brissot's orbit, on 16 July 1793, they were recalled by an upheld recall order by the Committee of Public Safety. It took until June of the following year for a ship to bring them back to France. They arrived in France in the time of the downfall of Robespierre and the Thermidorian Reaction. They were tried that winter, being acquitted of the charges the white colonial lobby had brought against them. Polverel did not survive to see the ruling, dying during the trial.

== Life and background ==
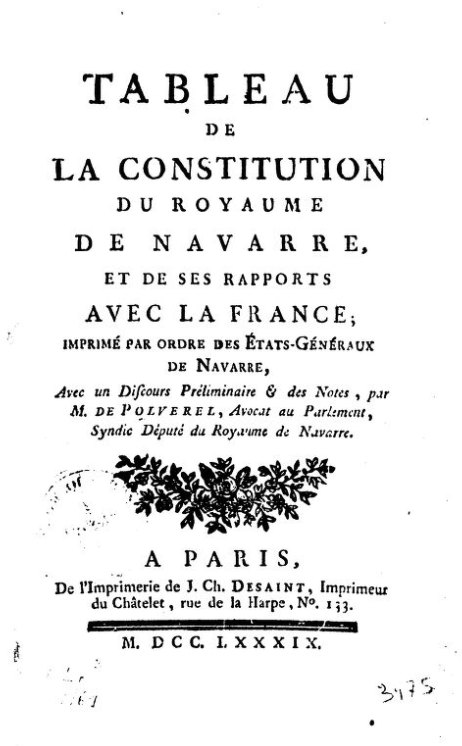
Report on the sovereignty of Navarre defended by Polverel in Paris

Born in Bearn, Polverel served as syndic for the region, and he was hired as a jurist by the Estates of Navarre to represent and defend the independence of the kingdom before the Parlement of Paris.

Étienne Polverel came from a wealthy, aristocratic background. By profession he was a lawyer. Polverel was also a Freemason and a member of the Jacobin Club. Some of the members in his Masonic lodge in Bordeaux were free blacks from Saint-Domingue, so he had early contacts with them before being sent to the colony on 17 September 1792.

Polverel was sent to Saint-Domingue along with Leger Felicite Sonthonax to enforce a law passed on 4 April 1792, which decreed that free blacks and whites in the colony were to have equal rights. Jacques Pierre Brissot, a prominent abolitionist at the time, lobbied for them to be sent and ensured that they were. The rights that were then denied to free blacks were the franchise and the right to hold office in the Colonial Assembly (the legislative body that ran internal affairs in the colony). The Assembly was at the time run only by whites. About 10,000 French troops went with Polverel and Sonthonax to help enforce the April 4th decree.

In 1795, after issuing emancipation proclamations in Saint-Domingue, Polverel was recalled to France. The National Convention had passed its own abolition of slavery, which vindicated Polverel and Sonthonax. However, plantation owners in France were furious with Polverel for having done so, so they put him on trial once he returned to France. The Committee of Public Safety (Comité de Salut public) deliberated for a few months on what to do about Sonthonax and Polverel, but Polverel got sick and died before a verdict on his fate was reached.

== Views on slavery and the revolution in France ==
Like many Jacobins, Polverel was a fervent supporter of the Revolution and its ideals. He was also a nationalist. Polverel was primarily committed to upholding the laws of the French assembly. In the Jacobin view, those who dissented from passed laws were not in the opposition, they were counter-revolutionaries to be dealt with harshly. Polverel seemed to have agreed with this view.

Following the French Revolution in 1789, Polverel began contributing to radical newspapers where he published articles against slavery. So ardent was his opposition to slavery that on one occasion he attempted to remove some pro-slavery members of the Jacobin club because of their views. The Revolution, thought Polverel, had no room for pro-slavery sentiments.

Despite his personal opposition to slavery Polverel put the laws of France first. When he and Sonthonax arrived in Saint-Domingue, one of their first acts was to issue a proclamation declaring that they had arrived to save slavery, not abolish it.

== Situation in Saint-Domingue prior to the commissioners' arrival ==
Saint-Domingue was probably the wealthiest colony in the world up until 1789. Rich whites held the best land, and mostly used it to grow sugar cane. Less profitable land was used to grow coffee, and both free blacks and whites owned coffee plantations. Coffee and sugar plantations produced tremendous wealth for France and its colonies, but the slave-laborers could not enjoy the fruits of their labor because they had few, if any, rights.

The Haitian Revolution of 1790 did not begin merely as a slave uprising. Instead, it was the combined result of two simultaneous though unrelated revolts. First, the free blacks of Saint-Domingue began an armed rebellion to gain equal rights with the white settlers. Although free blacks and colonial whites mingled and had generally decent relations, the whites held on to all political power and were willing to use violence to maintain it. The problem of the white colonists had to be settled before the matter of slavery. But even the whites were not totally unified: poor whites resented the wealth and influence of the rich plantation owners, and the wealthy were fearful of having their property stolen.

Second, the slaves revolted for various reasons. Some wanted to gain their immediate freedom, others fought for improved conditions on the plantations. For example, some slaves had heard that King Louis XVI was going to allow them to freely work for three days out of the week. While the truth of this statement from the King was disputed, it nevertheless encouraged some slaves to join the revolt so as to gain the rights allegedly promised to them.

The situation in the colony was therefore extremely precarious and needed careful handling.

== Involvement in the abolition of slavery in Saint-Domingue ==
Polverel arrived in Le Cap aboard the America as a Civil Commissioner to Saint-Domingue on 17 September 1792, along with Sonthonax and Jean-Antoine Ailhaud. He was given charge of Ouest, and when Ailhaud abandoned his post, Polverel took responsibility for Sud province as well.

When Sonthonax and Polverel first arrived in Saint-Domingue, they were met with hostility by the white settlers. Because the whites feared that Polverel came to abolish slavery, few of them supported the civil commissioners' mission, so Polverel turned to the free blacks for support. The free blacks proved to be the only reliable group that Polverel could ally with.

On 5 May 1793, Polverel issued a proclamation which demanded enforcement of the Code Noir. The Code Noir was a series of laws which stated that slaves must be treated with respect and not abused. Although passed in 1685, the Code Noir was never respected by the white colonists, who routinely abused the slaves. Polverel's proclamation on 5 May stated that slaves must be given basic provisions and small plots of land for them to manage. To ensure enforcement, the proclamation was translated to Creole and read aloud on all slave plantations. This would ensure that slaves would become aware of their new protections.

Shortly after the proclamation was issued, a new governor arrived in Le Cap, Saint-Domingue. His name was François-Thomas Galbaud du Fort. He owned property in the colony and hoped to preserve the slave system. For these reasons, he distrusted and even hated Polverel and Sonthonax. Galbaud insulted the civil commissioners, and his pro-slavery rhetoric was supported by many of Le Cap's whites. Sonthonax and Polverel returned to Le Cap (they were in different regions of Saint-Domingue) and imprisoned Galbaud in a ship because of his defiant behavior.

Galbaud, however, enjoyed support from the sailors then anchored near the ship and from other whites in the city. On 20 June 1793, Galbaud managed to escape and attack Le Cap, aiming to capture Sonthonax and Polverel. The commissioners, massively outnumbered, escaped to the outskirts of the city. Galbaud's followers rampaged through the city, and fires burnt much of it to the ground. To recapture the city, Polverel and Sonthonax issued a statement saying that all blacks who would join them and fight against Galbaud would be granted French citizenship. Some of the slaves who were revolting answered their call, as did many freed blacks. Some white troops also remained loyal to Polverel. With the combined efforts of these three groups, Polverel returned to Le Cap, defeated Galbaud, and took control of the city.

By this time, France and her empire was in a state of war with Spain and Britain thanks to the French Revolutionary Wars. Counter-revolutionary French planters had already signed an alliance with the British government to counter Republican control over Saint-Domingue. Both nations wished to assume control over the prosperous colony, in particular Spain, which maintained control over Captaincy General of Santo Domingo; the colony which occupied the eastern half of the island. Aware of the numerous threats to Republican control in the colony, Polverel quickly realized he needed to gather even more support to preserve French rule in Saint-Domingue. In August 1793, Polverel and Sonthonax issued general emancipation for all Blacks born in France's colonies, including for their families. Polverel followed that proclamation with another in October, which stated that all blacks were to be French citizens and enjoy full and complete equality. Following emancipation, though, Polverel hoped to provide one more incentive for the blacks to fight for the French Republic. He therefore decreed that blacks were to be given exclusive rights over land in a year's time. He also passed other laws on post-slave labor, including a requirement that freed slaves continue to work on their plantations for one year following the decree. This measures eventually won over the Black population of Saint-Domingue to the Republican cause, where Polverel wasted no time in drafting them into the pro-Republican forces active on the island. The new recruits assisted Polverel and other Republican commanders in keeping the colony French for almost a decade.
