= List of deputies from Saint-Domingue =

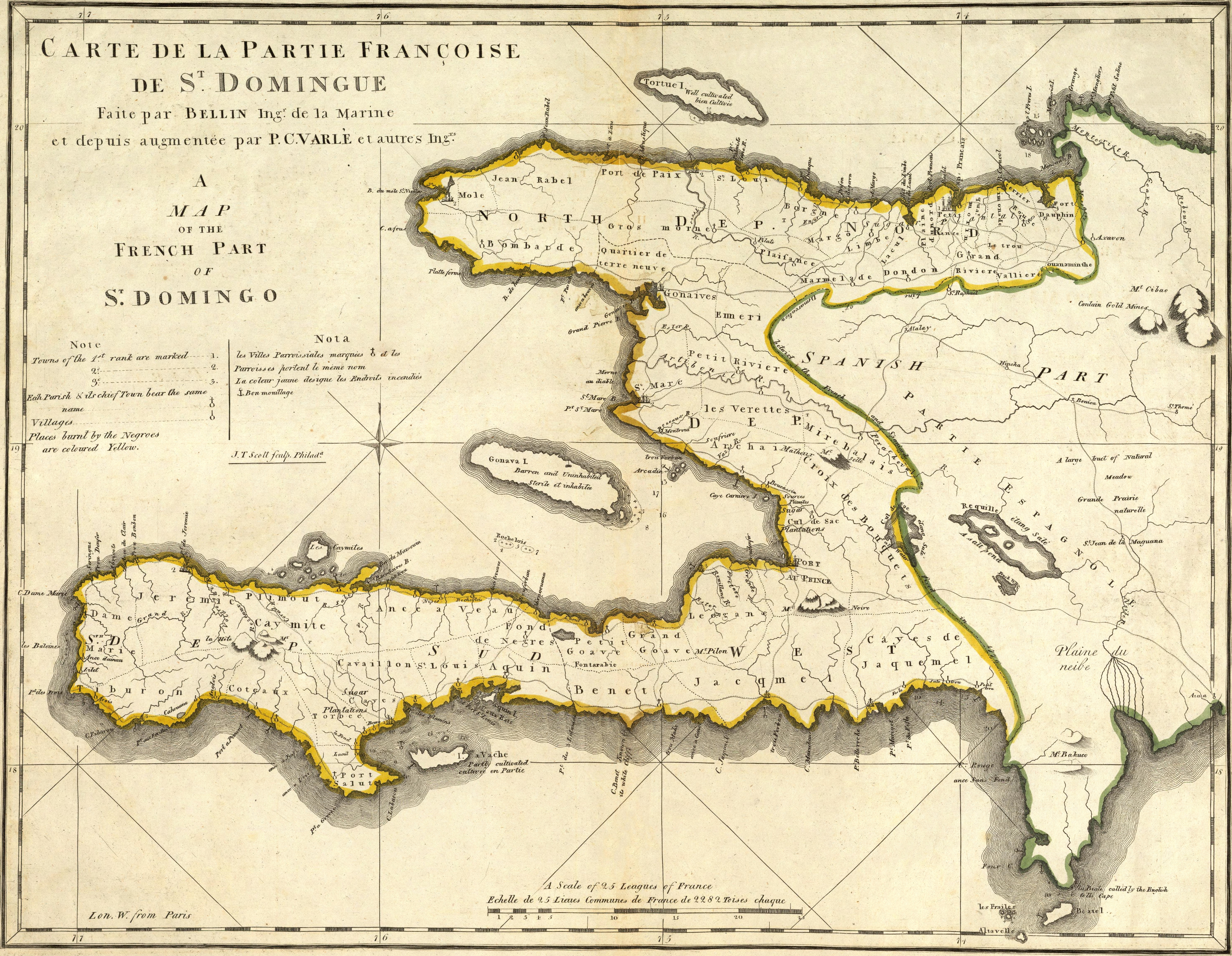
Map of Saint-Domingue and its departments

Saint-Domingue, a French colony in what is now Haiti, elected several deputies to the various French legislatures in the period between the calling of the Estates General of 1789 and Napoleon's Coup of 18 Brumaire in 1799. Peaking at 17 members in 1797, the deputation, with the exception of those elected in 1789, was diverse in race and origin, including former slaves, white officials from Metropolitan France, and even former slaveowners, one of whom had previously owned a fellow deputy.

Due to the circumstances of their elections, all validated deputies elected after 1793 came from the northern department and were republican in orientation, with several explicitly proclaiming their commitment to the union of pro-Republican parties formed in the aftermath of the Coup of 18 Fructidor. In 1799, as the union fell apart, the majority of the remaining deputation moved towards neo-Jacobinism, becoming members of the Manège Club.

The first elections were unauthorized, held in secret by white planters. The next, and first official, election occurred in 1793 in the northern department, following emancipation of the enslaved people there. Additional deputies were elected in 1796 and 1797, though they initially were unable to take their seats until the Coup of 18 Fructidor, due to the right-wing majority of the legislature. Deputies from the southern and western departments also attempted to gain admission, having been elected to take advantage of the conservative swing, but were rejected after the coup. At this peak, the deputation was composed of six blacks, seven whites, and four mixed. Elections followed in 1798 and 1799, but the deputies elected during these cycles were either never seated or never had their elections officially validated.

Divisions within the deputation, torn between the egalitarian and assimilationist colonial policy of the French Directory and the resolutely authoritarian and personal orientation of the autonomist government of Toussaint Louverture, only served to weaken it. By 1799, with the Coup of 18 Brumaire, colonial representation no longer had any reason to exist, as the overseas territories were pushed to the margins of the Republic under the Constitution of the Year VIII. In the immediate aftermath of the coup, the entire remaining deputation was excluded from the legislature. From then on, the offensive of the settlers' lobby, which had rallied in support of the coup, was given free rein.

The non-white deputies experienced both social and physical decline following the coup, with several being deported, arrested, and/or dying in custody. Others died in Paris or were killed in Haiti. Some of the white deputies met similar ends, with Étienne Maynaud de Bizefranc de Laveaux expelled from Guadeloupe and taken prisoner by the British, Louis-Pierre Dufay killed on the orders of Haitian Emperor Jean-Jacques Dessalines, and Sonthonax falling into disgrace and indigence.

== History ==
=== 1789 elections ===
The first elections in the colony were unauthorized, having been held in secret by white planters frustrated by the lack of local colonial assemblies, seeking representation in the Estates General and aiming to protect their racial hierarchy from the abolitionist Society of the Friends of the Blacks and free people of color, including those who owned slaves themselves. The deputies elected, 17 in total, were provisionally admitted to the Third Estate, having been rejected by the Second Estate. Nine of the deputies took the Tennis Court Oath and were absorbed "provisionally" into the National Assembly. To avoid a discussion of the morality of slavery, the assembly compromised by granting the colony only six seats, two from each province, significantly lower than the 20 Louis Marthe de Gouy d'Arsy had sought for the delegation.

The elected deputies would go on to join forces with the white colonists in Paris to form the Massiac Club, an organization of planters. Working in collaboration with the deputies, the club was able to convince Louis XVI to approve the creation of three colonial assemblies with policing and legislative powers.

=== 1793 election ===
The first authorised election occurred in the northern department in 1793, the only one under the Constitution of the Year I. In an effort to gain support from black insurgents, Commissioner Léger-Félicité Sonthonax had issued his "Decree of General Liberty" on 29 August, emancipating the slaves in the northern province with the rights of French citizens and implementing the Declaration of the Rights of Man and of the Citizen across the colony. The electors chose six deputies and three substitutes by individual ballot, requiring an absolute majority. The first elected was Jean-Baptiste Belley, a former black slave who had bought his freedom decades earlier. By the end of the session, including substitutes, three whites, three men of color, and three blacks had been elected.

Those elected were subjected to verbal abuse, threats, robbery, and even physical assaults from deported white refugee and migrant counterrevolutionaries. In Paris, they encountered opposition from Pierre-François Page and Augustin-Jean Brulley, a delegation from the recently dissolved white colonial assembly in Le Cap. This delegation had come to lobby for the interests of white plantation owners and to discredit the commissioners. They managed to persuade the Committee of General Security to arrest the deputies, before being forced to release them by the Committee of Public Safety. On 3 February 1794, three of them had made it to the National Convention, where they were quickly admitted as representatives for the northern province of the colony. Their arrival had been anticipated, with many deputies long hoping to have men of color among their ranks. The three were welcomed with repeated applause and a "fraternal embrace" from the president as they made their way to sit with the Montagnards. The following day, Dufaÿ delivered a lengthy speech recounting recent events in the colony. Afterwards, the Convention passed a decree emancipating slaves across all French territories. The three deputies were then embraced by their colleagues amid applause and cries of "Vive la République! Vive la Convention! Vive la Montagne!" By summer 1794, two more deputies, one of them being Boisson, had made it to France.

=== 1796 and 1797 elections ===
The election of additional deputies, along with the reelection of those already in Paris, occurred in northern Saint-Domingue in 1796, with more elected in 1797. Also in 1796, according to 1800s Haitian historian Thomas Madiou, elections were held in the southern and western departments by Rigaud and fellow southern general Louis-Jacques Beauvais. Rigaud sought to undermine interim governor Laveaux and Sonthonax. He planned to send his aide-de-camp, Bonnet, to accompany the deputies to Paris, where he would accuse Sonthonax of attempting to separate the colony from France. Rigaud aimed to exploit the conservative shift in Paris and appeared to advocate for a return to slavery in order to restore the island's former profitability. Most of the deputies elected were unable to depart in September as scheduled, while those who did were captured by the British.

The elected deputies from the north were initially unable to take their seats as the Clichy Club, led by its main colonial spokesperson, planter Vincent-Marie Viénot, Count of Vaublanc, convinced the legislature to annul both the 1796 and 1797 elections. According to them, the elections had not been conducted in accordance with the constitution, but under prior electoral regulations. They accused Laveaux, Sonthonax, and Louverture of having rigged the vote, claiming it was dictated by military despotism. Furthermore, they criticized emancipation, alleging it had led to, and was used to justify, unprecedented violence against whites in the colony, rendering it unprofitable.

The offensive by the Clichyens was cut short with the Coup of 18 Fructidor. On the day of the coup, a commission met, which validated the deputation a week later. The deputation of Saint-Domingue was therefore composed of 17 people, six blacks, seven whites, and four mixed. Due to the circumstances of their admittance, the representatives were attached to the "fructidorien current", with several of them explicitly proclaiming their commitment to the union of pro-Republican parties against the supporters of the royalist restoration, among whom were the most determined of their opponents. Several of them also aligned with the neo-Jacobin left.

Elected representatives from the South, Pinchinat and Rey Delmas, also took steps to obtain their approval. A new commission met in January 1798 to examine their case, concluding on 27 April 1798, that the elections in the Southern and Western departments should be annulled.

=== 1798 and 1799 elections ===
Elections were held again in the north in 1798, and in both the north and south in 1799, but the deputies elected during these cycles were either never seated or never had their elections officially validated.

By 1799, with the Coup of 18 Brumaire, colonial representation no longer had any reason to exist, as the overseas territories were pushed to the margins of the Republic under the Constitution of the Year VIII. In the immediate aftermath of the coup, the entire remaining deputation was excluded from the legislature. From then on, the offensive of the settlers' lobby, which had rallied in support of the coup, was given free rein.

The non-white deputies experienced both social and physical decline following the coup, with several being deported, arrested, and/or dying in custody. Others died in Paris or were killed in Haiti. Some of the white deputies met similar ends, with Étienne Maynaud de Bizefranc de Laveaux expelled from Guadeloupe and taken prisoner by the British, Louis-Pierre Dufay killed on the orders of Haitian Emperor Jean-Jacques Dessalines, and Sonthonax falling into disgrace and indigence.

== Activities in France ==
When the first non-white deputies from the colony were admitted by the National Covention in 1794, they weren't the "first" colored deputies in the legislature as Janvier Littée, a mixed pro-slavery deputy from Martinique, had been sitting in the Convention since 1793. Unlike those elected in 1789, who acted merely as proxies of the colonial assemblies they sought to create, those elected afterwards were representatives of the nation as a whole, both the metropole and her colonies. They did not limit themselves to colonial matters, but took part in a number of commissions, reporting on various issues of interest to the republic as a whole.

Due to the circumstances of their admittance, the representatives would become attached to the "fructidorien current", with several of them explicitly proclaiming their commitment to the union of pro-Republican parties, formed in the aftermath of the Coup of 18 Fructidor, against the supporters of the royalist restoration, among whom were the most determined of their opponents. Several of them also aligned with the neo-Jacobin left. As the union fell apart in 1799, the majority of the remaining deputation would move towards neo-Jacobinism, becoming members of the Manège Club. Brothier and unconfirmed deputy Rallier were opposed to the neo-Jacobins.

== Relations ==
As Toussaint Louverture consolidated power as governor of Saint-Domingue, members of the deputation, including some of its most prominent figures, grew increasingly hostile toward him, criticizing the neo-colonial regime he sought to establish. Among these critics was Jean-Baptiste Belley, who saw Toussaint's regime as counter-revolutionary. By 1799, the few deputies who continued to defend Toussaint, such as Laveaux and Guillaume Vergniaud, were in the minority. These internal divisions only served to weaken the deputation, torn between the egalitarian and assimilationist colonial policy of the French Directory and the resolutely authoritarian and personal orientation of the autonomist government of Louverture.

The 1796 unconfirmed deputies, led by Pierre Pinchinat, were angered by the overrepresentation of the northern department, which had monopolized the entire delegation. Sending several pettitions to the Directory, Pinchinat argued that the situation constantly poured slander on the "brave citizens" of the southern department, whose election had fully complied with the provisions of the Constitution of the Year III and had taken place before the arrival of the commission, when "the greatest unity reigned among the citizens".

== List ==
Deputies in order of election, if known.

=== Estates General (1789) ===
The deputies elected, 17 in total, were provisionally admitted to the Third Estate, having been rejected by the Second Estate.

Party/Club	Portrait	Name	Constituency	Year elected	Year left	Reason for tenure ending	Race
Unclear		Nicolas Robert de Cocherel	Saint-Domingue	1789	1789	Moved into the National Assembly	White
Unclear		Jean-Baptiste Gérard (député)	Saint-Domingue	1789	1789	Moved into the National Assembly	White
Massiac Club		Louis Marthe de Gouy d'Arsy	Saint-Domingue	1789	1789	Moved into the National Assembly	White
Unclear		Charles Léon Taillevis de Périgny	Saint-Domingue	1789	1789	Moved into the National Assembly	White
Massiac Club		Jean-Baptiste Gabriel Larchevesque-Thibaud	Saint-Domingue	1789	1789	Moved into the National Assembly	White
Unclear		Pierre André François Viau de Thébaudières	Saint-Domingue	1789	1789	Moved into the National Assembly	White
Unclear		François Reynaud de Villeverd	Saint-Domingue	1789	1789	Moved into the National Assembly	White

=== National Assemblies (1789–1791) ===
Nine of the 1789 deputies took the Tennis Court Oath and were absorbed "provisionally" into the National Assembly. To avoid a discussion of the morality of slavery, the assembly compromised by granting the colony only six seats, two from each province, significantly lower than the 20 Louis Marthe de Gouy d'Arsy had sought for the delegation. The National Constituent Assembly dissolved itself on 30 September 1791. Upon Maximilien de Robespierre's motion, it decreed that none of its members should be capable of sitting in the next legislature; this is known as the self-denying ordinance.

Party/Club	Portrait	Name	Constituency	Term start	Year left	Reason for tenure ending	Race
Unclear		Nicolas Robert de Cocherel	Western province	1789	1791	Self-denying ordinance	White
Unclear		Jean-Baptiste Gérard (député)	Southern province	1789	1791	Self-denying ordinance	White
Massiac Club		Louis Marthe de Gouy d'Arsy	Western province	1789	1791	Self-denying ordinance	White
Unclear		Charles Léon Taillevis de Périgny	Southern province	1789	1791	Self-denying ordinance	White
Massiac Club		Jean-Baptiste Gabriel Larchevesque-Thibaud	Northern province	1789	1789	Unclear	White
Unclear		Pierre André François Viau de Thébaudières	Northern province	1789	1790	Resigned, replaced by Villeblanche	White
Unclear		René Armand Le Vasseur de Villeblanche	Northern province	1789 (as a substitute)	1791	Self-denying ordinance	White
Unclear		François Reynaud de Villeverd	Northern province	1789	1791	Self-denying ordinance	White

==== Substitutes ====
Western (Note: Only the first four were recognized by the assembly)

- O-Gorman
- de Courrejolles
- Magallon des Mailles
- Dongé
- de Chabannes
- Vincendon-Dutour
- Cottineau de Kerloguen
- de Peyrac
- Choiseul (Duke of Praslin) (Note: Deputy for another area)

Northern (Note: Only the first six were recognized by the assembly)

- François Reynaud de Villeverd
- René Armand Le Vasseur de Villeblanche
- de Rouvray
- de Noé
- Chabanon des Salines
- Laborie
- Arnaud de Marsilly
- Auvray
- Le Fevre
- de Paroy
- de Vaudreuil
- Dupla'a

Southern

- Legardeur de Tilly
- Marmé
- Bodkin Fitz Gerald
- Duval Mouville

=== National Convention (1793–1795) ===
Party/Club	Portrait	Name	Constituency	Year elected	Year left	Reason for tenure ending	Race
The Mountain		Jean-Baptiste Belley	Northern department	1793	1795	Continued to serve into the Council of 500	Black
The Mountain		Louis-Pierre Dufay	Northern department	1793	1795	Continued to serve into the Council of 500	White
Unclear		Joseph Georges Boisson	Northern department	1793	1795	Continued to serve into the Council of 500	Black
Unclear		Pierre-Nicolas Garnot	Northern department	1793	1795	Continued to serve into the Council of 500	White
The Mountain		Jean-Baptiste Mills	Northern department	1793	1795	Continued to serve into the Council of Ancients	Mixed
Unclear		Étienne Bussière Laforest	Northern department	1793 (as a substitute)	1795	Continued to serve in the Council of 500	Mixed

==== Substitutes ====
- Marc Chavannes, Mixed
- "Citizen Richebourg", white

=== Council of Five Hundred (1795–1799) ===
Party/Club	Portrait	Name	Constituency	Year elected	Year left	Reason for tenure ending	Race
The Mountain		Jean-Baptiste Belley	Northern department	1795	1798 (Note: Levecq, citing Kuściński, gives 1797 for Delley. Kuściński says Belley, like all the convention deputies of the colonies, sat in the council until 1 Prairial, Year V (1797), but then says, for everyone else's entries, like all the convention deputies of the colonies, they sat in the council until 1 Prairial Year VI (1798). 1798 is used by other sources. The assembly website uses both for different pages. 1797 wouldn't make sense as they continued to serve after the Coup of 18 Fructidor, which is after the 1797 date.)	Drew the note stating: "Member of the Council of 500 until this coming May."	Black
The Mountain		Jean-Baptiste Belley	Northern department	1796	1798	Drew the note stating: "Member of the Council of 500 until this coming May."	Black
The Mountain		Louis-Pierre Dufay	Northern department	1795	1798	Unclear	White
The Mountain		Louis-Pierre Dufay	Northern department	1796	1798	Unclear	White
Republicans (Note: 1797–1799)		Joseph Georges Boisson	Northern department	1795	1798	Unclear	Black
Republicans		Joseph Georges Boisson	Northern department	1796	1798	Unclear	Black
Republicans		Pierre-Nicolas Garnot	Northern department	1795	1798	Unclear	White
Republicans		Pierre-Nicolas Garnot	Northern department	1796	1798	Unclear	White
Republicans		Etienne Bussière Laforest	Northern department	1795	1798	Unclear	Mixed
Republicans		Etienne Bussière Laforest	Northern department	1796	1798	Unclear	Mixed
Republicans		Pierre Thomany (Note: Unlike Gainot and Levecq, Gaffney does not mention a Pierre Thomany but a "Citizen Chaunany")	Northern department	1796	1799	Unclear	Black
Republicans (1797–1799)		Léger-Félicité Sonthonax	Northern department	1796	1799	Unclear	White
Manège Club (From 1799)		Léger-Félicité Sonthonax	Northern department	1796	1799	Unclear	White
Republicans		François Pétiniaud	Northern department	1796 (Note: Gainot, Gaffney, and Levecq say these deputies were elected in 1796 along with the other deputies. The assembly website says they were elected in 1795.)	1799	Unclear	Mixed
Republicans		Louis François Boisrond-Jeune	Northern department	1796	1799	Unclear	Mixed
Republicans (1797–1799)		Pierre-Joseph Leborgne	Northern department	1797	Unclear	Unclear	White
Manège Club (From 1799)		Pierre-Joseph Leborgne	Northern department	1797	Unclear	Unclear	White
Republicans (1797–1799)		Étienne Mentor	Northern department	Moved from the Ancients	1799	Excluded from the legislative body immediately after the Coup of 18 Brumaire	Black
Manège Club (From 1799)		Étienne Mentor	Northern department	Moved from the Ancients	1799	Excluded from the legislative body immediately after the Coup of 18 Brumaire	Black
Republicans (1797–1799)		Guillaume Vergniaud	Northern department	1797 (Note: Gainot says Vergniaud was in the Council of Ancients. Binoche and Robert say he was in the Council of 500.)	1799	Reelected as a deputy for Haute-Vienne on 10 April 1799. Would go on to support the Coup of 18 Brumaire	White

=== Council of Ancients (1795–1799) ===
Party/Club	Portrait	Name	Constituency	Year elected	Year left	Reason for tenure ending	Race
The Mountain		Jean-Baptiste Mills	Northern department	1795	1798	Unclear	Mixed
The Mountain		Jean-Baptiste Mills	Northern department	1796	1798	Unclear	Mixed
Republicans (1797–1799)		Étienne Maynaud de Bizefranc de Laveaux	Northern department	1796	1799	Reelected as a deputy for Saône-et-Loire on 13 April 1799	White
Manège Club (From 1799)		Étienne Maynaud de Bizefranc de Laveaux	Northern department	1796	1799	Reelected as a deputy for Saône-et-Loire on 13 April 1799	White
Republicans (1797–1799)		Martin Noël Brothier	Northern department	1796	Unclear	Unclear	White
Anti-Neo-Jacobin (From 1799)		Martin Noël Brothier	Northern department	1796	Unclear	Unclear	White
Republicans		Jean-Louis Annecy	Northern department	1796 (Note: In his 2025 article, Gainot says Annecy was in the Council of 500. In his biography for Annecy, he repeatedly says Annecy was in the Council of Ancients.)	1799	Excluded from the legislative body immediately after the Coup of 18 Brumaire	Black
Republicans (1797–1799)		Étienne Mentor	Northern department	1797	Unclear	Validated by the council, but moved to the Council of 500 due to his age	Black
Manège Club (From 1799)		Étienne Mentor	Northern department	1797	Unclear	Validated by the council, but moved to the Council of 500 due to his age	Black
Republicans		Jacques Tonnelier	Northern department	1797	1799	Left during the Coup of 18 Brumaire	Black

=== Elected, but not seated ===
Party/Club	Portrait	Name	Constituency	Year elected	Reason	Ethnicity
Unclear		"Citizen Réchin"	Northern department	1793	Unable to leave Port-de-Paix as the town was surrounded by British naval forces. Replaced by Laforest.	Black
Unclear		Jean Rey-Delmas	Western department	1796	Election not validated	Mixed
Unclear		Fontaine	Western department	1796	Election not validated	Unclear
Unclear		Sala	Southern department	1796	Killed. Election not validated	White
Unclear		Decand	Southern department	1796	Election not validated	White
Unclear		George Pierre	Southern department	1796	Election not validated	Black
Unclear		Daniel Gélec	Southern department	1796	Election not validated	Mixed
Unclear		Pierre Pinchinat	Southern department	1796	Election not validated	Mixed
Unclear		Julien Raimond	Southern department	1796	Election not validated	Mixed
Unclear		Brulley (Auguste Jean Brulley?)	Southern department	1796	Election not validated	White
Unclear		Thomas Millet	Southern department	1796	Election not validated	White
Unclear		Yon Pauliau	Southern department	1796	Election not validated	White
Unclear		(Note: Gainot states there were four white settlers elected on 26 Fructidor Year IV, but only names three)	Southern department	1796	Election not validated	White
Unclear		Pierre-Antoine fils	Northern department	1797 (Note: Gainot says they were elected in 1796. Gaffney does mention them in her discussion on the 1796 elections, and Johnson, citing Beaubrun Ardouin, says they were elected in 1797.)	Unclear	Black
Unclear		Antoine Chanlatte	Northern department	1797	Unclear	Mixed
Unclear		Jean-Baptiste Deville	Northern department	1798	Election not validated until October 21, 1799. The Coup of 18 Brumaire occurred three weeks later.	Black
Unclear		Pierre-Nicolas Garnot	Southern department	1799	Election not validated	White
Unclear		Pierre Pinchinat	Southern department	1799	Election not validated	Mixed
Unclear		Rallier	Northern department	1799	Election not validated	Unclear
Unclear		Paschal	Northern department	1799	Election not validated	Unclear

== Works cited ==
- Benzaken, Jean-Charles (1 June 2012). "Louis-Pierre Dufay, député abolitionniste et homme d'affaires avisé. Esquisse biographique". Annales historiques de la Révolution française (368). OpenEdition: 61–85. doi:10.4000/ahrf.12301. ISSN 0003-4436.
- Binoche, Jacques (1978). "Les députés d'outre-mer pendant la Révolution française (1789-1799)". Annales historiques de la Révolution française (in French). 231 (1). PERSEE Program: 45–80. doi:10.3406/ahrf.1978.4072. ISSN 0003-4436.
- Casimir, Jean (2020-09-29). The Haitians. Chapel Hill: UNC Press Books. ISBN 978-1-4696-6049-3.
- DUBOIS, Laurent (2009). Avengers of the New World: The Story of the Haitian Revolution. Harvard University Press. ISBN 9780674034365.
- Latino(a) Research Review. CELAC. 2002.
- Frey, Linda; Frey, Marsha (2004), The French Revolution (illustrated, annotated ed.), Greenwood Publishing Group, p. 98, ISBN 9780313321931
- Gaffney, Jennifer Ann (2014-04-23). Citizenship and Emancipation: Voting Rights during the Haitian Revolution after 1793 (Thesis). hdl:1969.1/152862.
- Gainot, Bernard (2025-01-20). "Les représentants de couleur de Saint-Domingue dans les assemblées de la Première République". La Révolution française (in French). 27 (27). doi:10.4000/13467. ISSN 2105-2557.
- Gainot, Bernard (1997). "La députation de Saint-Domingue au corps législatif du Directoire". Revue française d'histoire d'outre-mer (in French). 84 (316). PERSEE Program: 95–110. doi:10.3406/outre.1997.3577. ISSN 0300-9513.
- Archives parlementaires de 1787 à 1860 : recueil complet des débats législatifs & politiques des chambres françaises, imprimé par ordre du Sénat et de la Chambre des députés ser.1:t.84 1794:Jan.-Feb. Paris : Libr. administrative de P. Dupont. 1867 – via HathiTrust.
- "Dictionnaire des conventionnels, par A. Kuściński v.1-2". HathiTrust. 25 December 2024.
- Johnson, Erica R. (2018-06-19). Philanthropy and Race in the Haitian Revolution. Cham: Springer. ISBN 978-3-319-76144-2.
- Levecq, Christine (2019). "Jean-Baptiste Belley and French Republicanism". Black Cosmopolitans: Race, Religion, and Republicanism in an Age of Revolution. University of Virginia Press. ISBN 9780813942193.
- Popkin, Jeremy (2011). "Saint-Domingue, Slavery and the Origins of the French Revolution". In Kaiser, Thomas; Kley, Dale Van (eds.). From Deficit to Deluge: The Origins of the French Revolution. Stanford University Press. ISBN 9780804772815.
- Gainot, Bernard (2012). "Chapitre 4. Jean-Louis Annecy (vers 1758-vers 1807) : du Cap-Français aux Tuileries, des Tuileries au bagne, un parcours emblématique". Figures d'esclaves : présences, paroles, représentations (in French). Presses universitaires de Rouen et du Havre. pp. 71–85. doi:10.4000/books.purh.6249. ISBN 978-2-87775-552-8.
- Robert, Adolphe (1891c). Dictionnaire des parlementaires français (1789-1869), tome III, Fes - Lav, 1891. Vol. III. Bourloton.
- Robert, Adolphe (1891d). Dictionnaire des parlementaires français (1789-1869), tome IV, Fes - Lav, 1891. Vol. IV. Bourloton.
- Robert, Adolphe (1891e). Dictionnaire des parlementaires français (1789-1869), tome III, Fes - Lav, 1891. Vol. V. Bourloton.
