= 1793 French legislative election in Saint-Domingue =

1793 election in Saint-Domingue

← 1789	24 September 1793	1796 →
- Six deputies, three substitutes for election

An election to the National Convention was held in the northern province of the French colony of Saint-Domingue on 24 September 1793, following primary elections. Delayed a day, the election was the only one in France held under the Constitution of the Year I, which included universal manhood suffrage, and Léger-Félicité Sonthonax's Decree of General Liberty, which emancipated the slave population in the northern province.

The electors convened in Le Cap to elect six deputies and three substitutes for the colony. In total, including substitutes, three whites, three men of color, and three blacks were elected, including Jean-Baptiste Belley, a former black slave. As Belley and the other deputies who had accepted their appointments made their way to France in late 1793, they were subjected to verbal abuse, threats, robbery, and even physical assaults from deported white refugee and migrant counterrevolutionaries. One of the black representatives, Joseph Georges Boisson, was even taken hostage by them in Philadelphia.

By the time the delegation arrived in France, only three remained, Belley, Dufaÿ, and Mills, one from each race. In Paris, they encountered opposition from white planter lobbyists and were briefly arrested, before being freed by the Committee of Public Safety. On 3 February 1794, they entered the National Convention during its daily proceedings and were quickly admitted as representatives for the northern province of the colony. Their arrival had been anticipated, with many deputies long hoping to have men of color among their ranks. The three were welcomed with repeated applause and a "fraternal embrace" from the president as they made their way to sit with the Montagnards. The following day, after being informed of the situation in the colony, the Convention passed a decree emancipating slaves across all French territories.

By summer 1794, two more deputies, one of them being Boisson, had made it to France.

== Background ==
In August 1791, a massive slave revolt erupted in the northern province of Saint-Domingue, followed by renewed clashes between whites and free people of color in the southern and western provinces. To restore order, the National Assembly dispatched three commissioners, along with troops, to the colony in June 1792 with "all the necessary powers, such as suspending or even dissolving the colonial assemblies now in existence, controlling the public force, and taking all measures necessary to insure the execution of the said Law of April 4," which granted the rights of citizens to free people of color, in the hopes that it would unite them with the commissioners against the rebelling slaves.

In the northern province, Commissioner Léger-Félicité Sonthonax, a Jacobin and abolitionist, moved swiftly to implement radical reforms. In October, recognizing that many whites interpreted the French Revolution as freedom from the metropole, Sonthonax and fellow commissioner Étienne Polverel dissolved the completely white colonial assemblies. In their place, they established the Intermediary Commission, composed of half former assembly members and half men of color selected by the commissioners. They rewrote the municipal election laws to include free people of color, with Sonthonax organizing a huge assembly on the Le Cap, before the other two commissioners left to restore order in the other provinces. As his relations with the white population deteriorated, he promoted a few nonwhite officers to the regular army, secured declarations of loyalty to the April 4 law from most troops, and later restructured the National Guard, installing men of color in command positions. By early 1793, the convention had given the commissioners virtually unlimited powers.

On 7 May 1793, General François-Thomas Galbaud du Fort, plantation owner and newly appointed governor, arrived in Le Cap while Sonthonax was absent, to take command of its troops. Sympathetic to the white planter class, Galbaud quickly attracted counterrevolutionary support and began publicly criticizing the commissioners. As such, the commissioners ordered him not to take any action. Galbaud ignored their orders and began undermining the alliance the commissioners had cultivated with free people of color. The commissioners dismissed him, but Galbaud, encouraged by British and Spanish sailors in the harbor, refused to leave. Instead, he seized control of most of the ships there and launched an assault on Le Cap on 20 June with roughly 2,000 men. Desperate for help, the commissioners on that same day promised limited freedom to slaves who would fight for the republic. By the end of the three-day battle, most of Le Cap had been destroyed, and 3,000-10,000 had been killed.

Afterwards, Sonthonax, seeking to win over the insurgents in the northern province, issued his "Decree of General Liberty" on 29 August, emancipating the slaves in the northern province with the rights of French citizens and implementing the Declaration of the Rights of Man and of the Citizen across the colony, though only some insurgents joined initially. Commissioner Polverel in the western province was slower at implementing general abolition, but by October, he issued a decree of general emancipation for the whole colony.

On 12 September, Sonthonax ordered the local assemblies in the northern province to begin primary elections for the representatives that would elect deputies to the convention on 23 September, regardless of the number they find themselves. These would be the only elections in France held under the Constitution of Year I, which included universal manhood suffrage.

== Election ==
On 23 September, the electors convened in a house in Le Cap, formerly called the Government, where the municipality held its sessions, to elect six deputies and three substitutes. Realizing that not all of the electors had arrived, the present electors decided to postpone the election for the next morning, which was approved by Sonthonax.

The following day, at 9:00 am, the rest of the electors were verified without complaint. As the meeting was for the greater good of the public, the electors unanimously approved keeping all doors open, so that the public could witness the operations of the said electors. While there is no proof of newly freed blacks voting, there were several men of color among the candidates. The electors then proceeded to elect a president, secretary, and three verifiers. Afterwards, they proceeded to elect the deputies through individual ballots, requiring an absolute majority. The first to be elected was Jean-Baptiste Belley, a former black slave who had bought his freedom decades earlier, followed by Louis-Pierre Dufaÿ, white; Joseph Georges Boisson, black; Pierre-Nicolas Garnot, white; Jean-Baptiste Mills, mixed; and Réchin, black. Following several ballots, Laforest the Elder was elected as a substitute, followed by Marc Chavannes and Richebourg. Only Belley, Dufay, Garnot, Mills, and Richebourg were present to take the oath, with the president of the assembly having to write to each of the others in order to inform them of their appointment and ask whether they accepted said position. In total, including substitutes, three whites, three men of color, and three blacks had been elected.

== Aftermath ==
Réchin was unable to leave Port-de-Paix, as the town was blockaded by the Royal Navy. As Belley and the other deputies who had accepted their appointments made their way to France in late 1793, they were subjected to verbal abuse, threats, robbery, and even physical assaults from deported white refugee and migrant counterrevolutionaries. One of the black representatives, Boisson, was even taken hostage by them in Philadelphia.

By the time the delegation arrived in France, only three remained, Belley, Dufaÿ, and Mills, one from each race. In Paris, they encountered opposition from Pierre-François Page and Augustin-Jean Brulley, a delegation from the recently dissolved white colonial assembly in Le Cap. This delegation had come to lobby for the interests of white plantation owners and to discredit the commissioners. They managed to persuade the Committee of General Security to arrest the deputies, before being forced to release them by the Committee of Public Safety.

On 3 February 1794, they entered the National Convention during its daily proceedings and were quickly admitted as representatives for the northern province of the colony. Their arrival had been anticipated, with many deputies long hoping to have men of color among their ranks. The three were welcomed with repeated applause and a "fraternal embrace" from the president as they made their way to sit with the Montagnards.

The following day, Dufaÿ delivered a lengthy speech recounting recent events in the colony. Afterwards, the Convention passed a decree emancipating slaves across all French territories. The three deputies were then embraced by their colleagues amid applause and cries of "Vive la République! Vive la Convention! Vive la Montagne!" By summer 1794, the other two duputies, Garnot and Boisson, had made it to France.
