= Le Jeune Case =

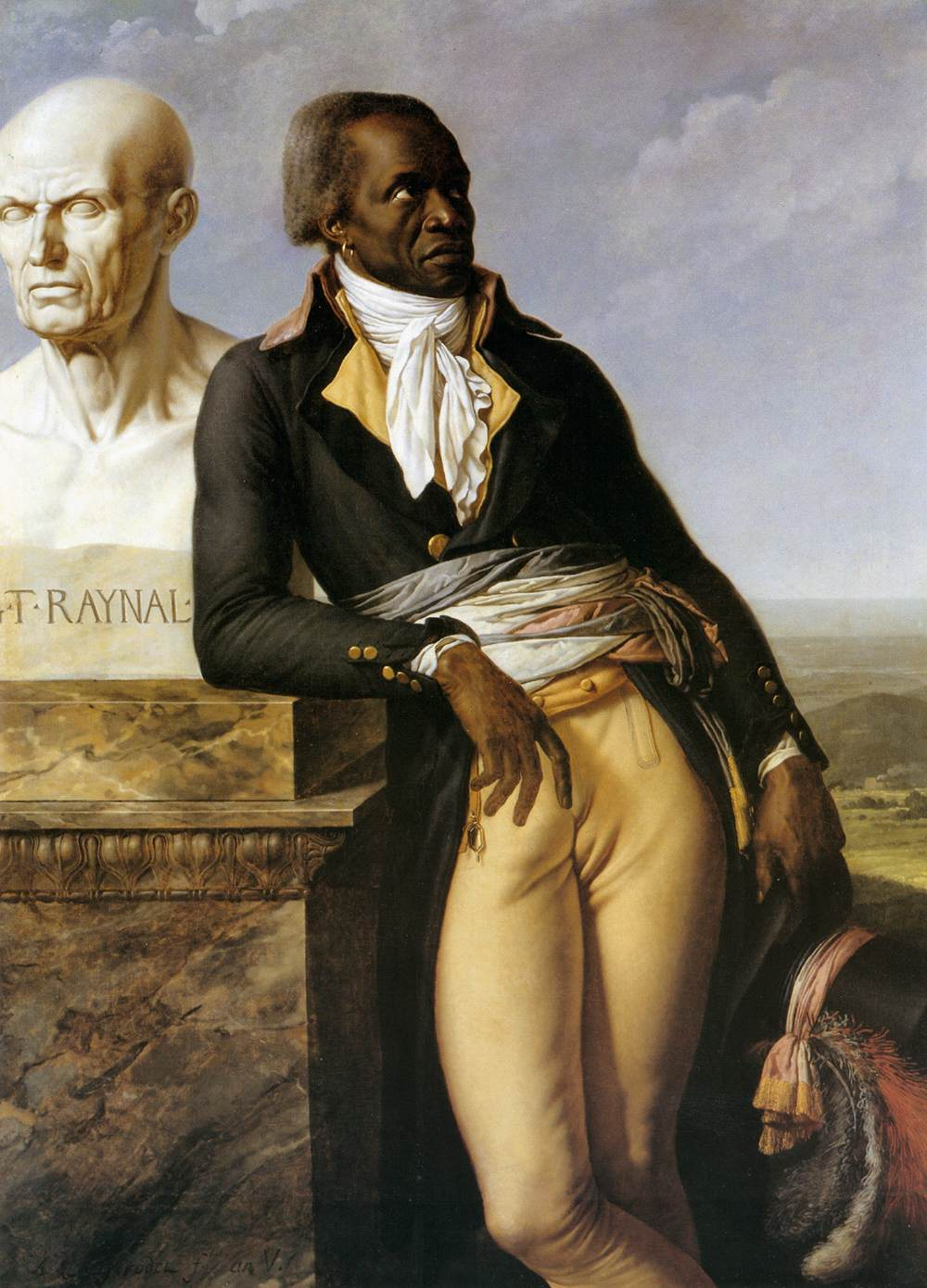
- Haitian revolutionary and former slave Jean-Baptiste Belley, who lived in the area of Le Cap where the Le Jeune case was first heard. Portrait by Anne-Louis Girodet De Roucy-Trioson.
- Court: Le Cap colonial court; Port-au-Prince superior court.
- Decided: 1788

Case history
- Appealed from: Le Cap colonial court
- Appealed to: Port-au-Prince superior court

Case opinions
- Planter Le Jeune acquitted of having tortured and murdered his slaves.

The Le Jeune Case (or "Lejeune case") was a suit brought by 14 slaves against torture and murder by their master, Nicolas Le Jeune, in the French colony of Saint-Domingue in 1788. Le Jeune was accused of torturing and murdering six slaves, who he said had planned to poison him. Despite overwhelming evidence of Le Jeune's guilt, courts ruled in favor of the planter, demonstrating the complicity of Saint-Domingue's legal system in the brutalization of slaves. The Haitian Revolution ending slavery in Saint-Domingue would begin only three years later.

== Background ==
In 1685, France enacted the Code Noir, regulating the treatment of slaves in its colonies. The code was brutal, and allowed both whipping and exploitation of slaves. Slaves who escaped as Maroons were to be branded, hamstrung or executed. But the code also required that slaves be clothed and fed, and it ostensibly protected them against torture, murder and rape. The codes were rarely enforced, and beginning in 1767, French King Louis XV and his administration began amending the codes to reduce their protections of slaves, free blacks and mulattoes, and white colonists who might form personal relationships with them. In 1784 however, in response to abuses from slave-holding planters, France re-imposed more stringent regulations under the Code.

== Allegations of murder and torture ==
In March 1788, 14 slaves left the coffee plantation of Nicolas Le Jeune in Plaisance, Nord, southwest of Le Cap-Haïtien. They informed authorities in Le Cap that Le Jeune had murdered four of them, and was torturing two enslaved women at his plantation. Judges in Le Cap formed a commission to investigate the case, and its officers visited Le Jeune's plantation, where they found two women who were chained, and dying from wounds of torture. Le Jeune, who had burned off portions of their limbs, claimed that they were part of a slave plot to poison him. Investigators found no poison in the women's possessions. When both died, the Governor of Saint-Domingue demanded the arrest of Le Jeune, who fled.

Fear of poisoning by slaves was common in Saint-Domingue, and planters often extracted confessions of past or planned poisoning through torture.

== Legal proceedings ==
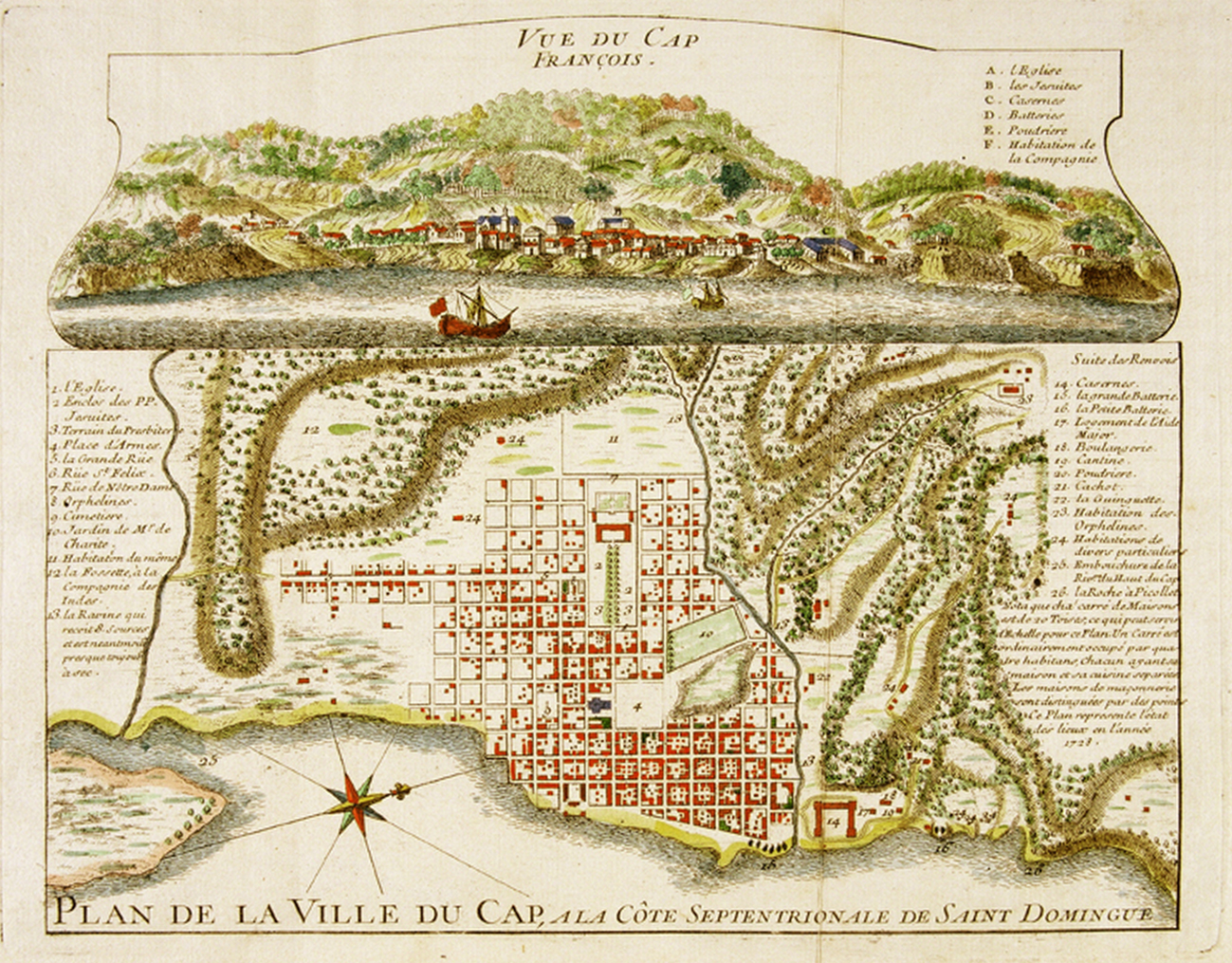
Map of Colonial-era Le Cap in 1728; slaves would bring their suit against Le Jeune to Le Cap courts in 1788.

In preliminary hearings, the 14 slaves reiterated their testimony against Le Jeune. In response to the case, however, white planters in Saint-Domingue began a campaign in Le Jeune's defense, fearing that the "entire racial foundation" of slavery in the colony was imperiled. Seven white witnesses testified to support Le Jeune, and hundreds of planters in influential colonial associations petitioned on his behalf. Saint-Domingue's governor wrote to colonial administrators in France that "the safety of the colony depends on the acquittal of Le Jeune." Judges in Le Cap acquitted Le Jeune.

In response, the public prosecutor appealed before a superior legal council in Port-au-Prince, but fearing a hopeless case, he disappeared on the day of the hearing. Le Jeune was again acquitted.

== Legacy ==
The Le Jeune case demonstrated that colonial courts and authorities would defend the privileges of white colonists at all costs, and were willing to ignore laws passed in France that threatened their interests. White colonists in Saint-Domingue maintained that by protecting slavery, they were protecting property rights, and were thus acting in defense of individual liberties.

Many French Enlightenment figures opposed slavery, and Denis Diderot's Encyclopedia article on the slave trade wrote, "let the colonies be destroyed rather than be the cause of so much evil." But after his description of the Le Jeune case, historian C. L. R. James concludes that Enlightenment ideals were unable to effect change in the slave trade of France's colonies.

Historian Laurent Dubois argues that colonial officials who prosecuted Le Jeune did so fearing Saint-Domingue's slaves would revolt unless Le Jeune was punished. Historian Philippe Girard concludes that the Le Jeune case represented the "first steps of a revolutionary process that eventually culminated with the slave revolt," referring to the Haitian Revolution that began in August 1791.
