= Lists of deputies of the National Assembly of France =

This article is a list of French MPs by Parliament.

== List ==
=== By year ===
- List of deputies of the 11th National Assembly of France (1997 to 2002)
- List of deputies of the 12th National Assembly of France (2002 to 2007)
- List of deputies of the 13th National Assembly of France (2007 to 2012)
- List of deputies of the 14th National Assembly of France (2012 to 2017)
- List of deputies of the 15th National Assembly of France (2017 to 2022)
- List of deputies of the 16th National Assembly of France (2022 to 2025)
- List of deputies of the 17th National Assembly of France (2025 to present)

=== By department ===
- List of deputies from Alpes-de-Haute-Provence
- List of Deputies from Gironde
- List of deputies from Hautes-Alpes
- List of deputies from Saint-Domingue
- List of deputies from Savoie

== See also ==
- Politics of France
