= Jean-Baptiste Belley =

French politician (1746/1747–1805)

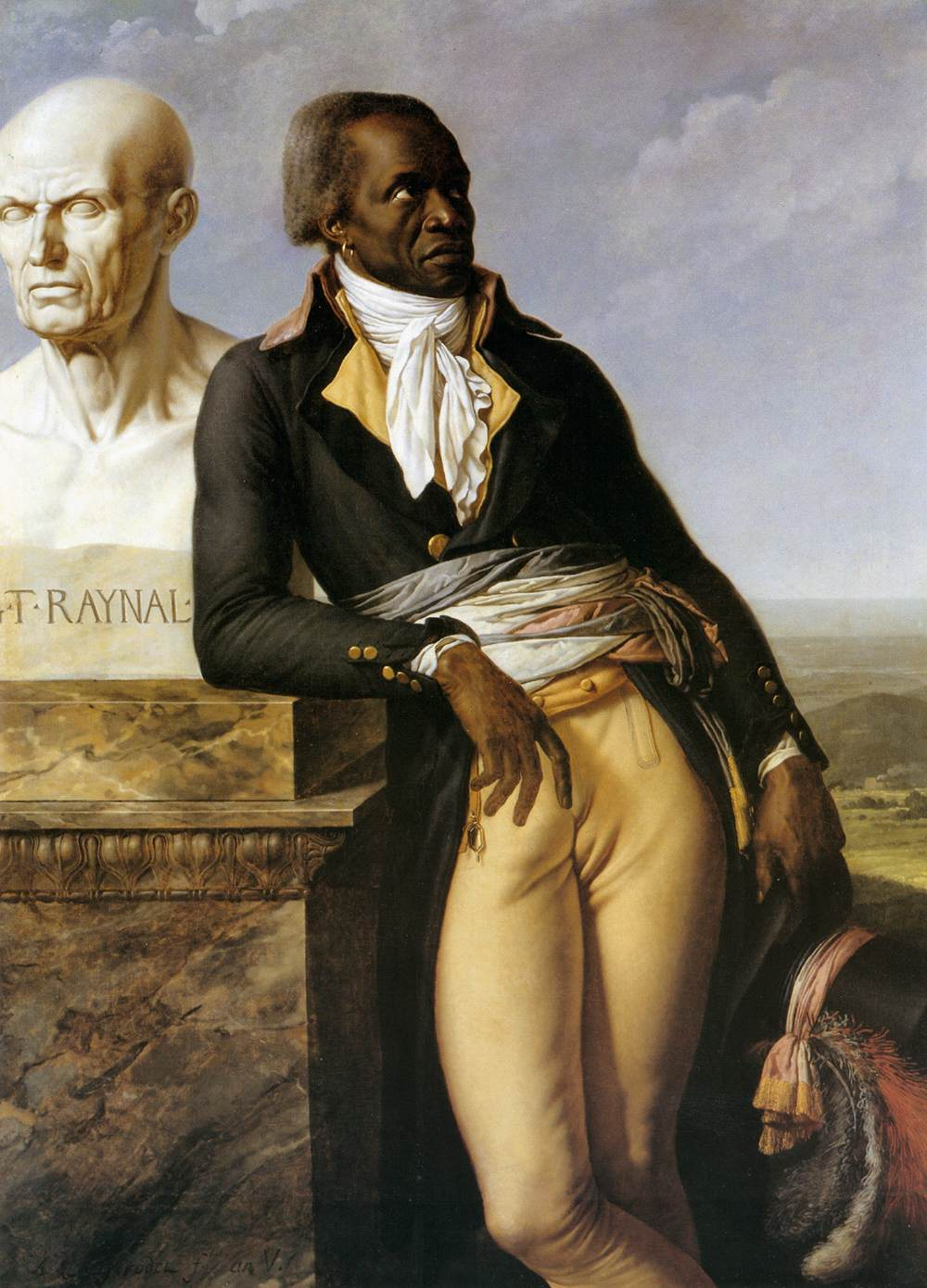
- Portrait of Jean-Baptiste Belley by Anne-Louis Girodet de Roussy-Trioson, 1797

Deputy in the National Convention
- In office 24 September 1793 – 31 October 1795
- Parliamentary group: The Mountain
- Constituency: Saint-Domingue

Deputy in the Council of Five Hundred
- In office 31 October 1795 – May 1797
- Parliamentary group: The Mountain
- Constituency: Saint-Domingue

Personal details
- Born: 1 July 1746/1747 Gorée, Senegal
- Died: 6 August 1805 (aged 58) Le Palais, Brittany

Jean-Baptiste Belley (1 July 1746 or 1747 – 6 August 1805) was a French politician. A native of Senegal and formerly enslaved in the colony of Saint-Domingue in the French West Indies, he was an elected member of the National Convention and the Council of Five Hundred during the French First Republic. He was also known as Mars.

== Life ==
Belley was said to have been born on 1 July in either 1746 or 1747, on the island of Gorée, Senegal, but the precise dates of his birth and death are uncertain. At the age of two, he was sold to slavers sailing for the French colony of Saint-Domingue. With his savings, he later bought his freedom. Belley subsequently became a slave owner himself; among the slaves he owned was a mulatto (mixed African and European) named Fanchonette whom Belley bought for 300 livres in 1780, and another was a woman named Laurore who he sold to a friend in 1787. In 1791, a slave rebellion broke out in Saint-Domingue, sparking chaos across the colony.

As a result of the French Revolution, conflict erupted in Saint-Domingue between Royalists and Republicans in the colony. In 1793, Belley fought as an infantry captain against Royalist forces in Saint-Domingue and was wounded six times. On 24 September 1793, he was one of three deputies elected to the National Convention to represent the northern region of Saint-Domingue, together with the mulatto Jean-Baptiste Mills and the white Louis-Pierre Dufaÿ. He became the first black deputy to take a seat at the convention. He, along with the other two elected deputies, sat with the Montagnards. On 3 February 1794, he spoke in a debate in the convention when it decided unanimously to abolish slavery. In a 1795 statement, Belley wrote that he had been the "owner of thinking properties" and praised the 1794 abolition decree as "just and beneficent".

However, the formal abolition of slavery did not disarm the Royalists, and the war continued. Recognized as a full citizen of the Republic, Belley was an active spokesman for black people. When Benoît Gouly, a pro-slavery deputy from Isle de France (present-day Mauritius), called for special laws reinstituting slavery for the French colonies, Belley denounced a pro-slavery pressure group known as the Massiac Club in a speech published under the title The Settlers' Ear, or the Massiac Hotel System Updated by Gouly. He succeeded for a time in maintaining the Republican principle of equality between people in France and in its colonies, whatever their colour.

In a declaration of age and marital status for the representatives of Saint-Domingue in the convention, Belley says that he was born at Gorée, is forty-eight years old, has never left the territory of the republic, and has lived forty six years at Cap-Français. In a 'declaration of fortune' dated at Paris on 10 Vendémiaire, Year 4 of the Republic (viz., 1 October 1795), Belley declares that from the Republic he has only his 'emoluments', that he has bought no property, and that he owns only the contents of his room.

Belley continued to serve into the Council of Five Hundred and was reelected on 8 September 1796. On 5 March 1797, he drew the note stating: "Member of the Council of 500 until this coming May." Belley returned to Saint-Domingue in 1802 as a gendarme officer in the expeditionary force commanded by Divisional-general Charles Leclerc. However, Belley was subsequently arrested and sent back to France, where he was imprisoned under house arrest in Belle Île. Belley was still being held prisoner there in 1805 when he wrote to Isaac Louverture, the son of Toussaint Louverture, and died later the same year on 6 August.

== Portrait ==
In about 1797, Belley's portrait was painted by Anne-Louis Girodet de Roussy-Trioson, and was exhibited in Paris in 1798.
