= Jean-Louis Annecy =

Haitian politician

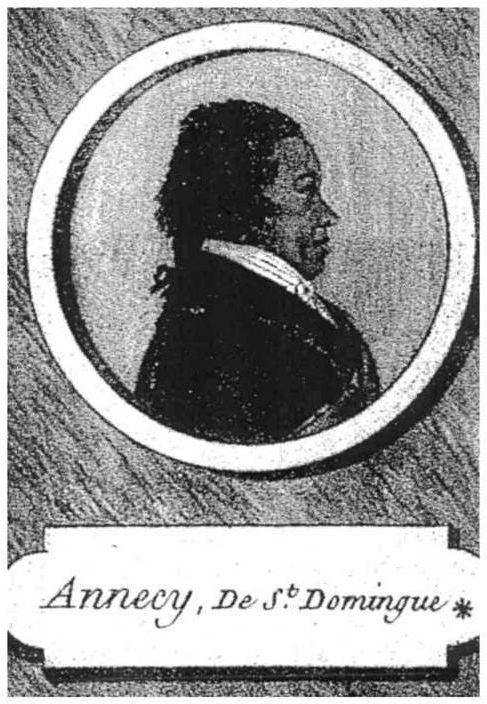
Jean-Louis Annecy ca. 1799

Jean-Louis Annecy (c. 1758 – c. 1807) was a French deputy who was a victim of the deportation of Guadeloupeans and Haïtians in Corsica by Napoleon Bonaparte.

He was elected to the Council of Ancients on 17 April 1797.

== Biography ==
Jean-Louis was born into slavery around 1758 in the French colony of Saint-Domingue. His master, Pierre Antoine, a free man of color employed by the “company of free negroes of the Cape,” took him along as an aide-de-camp during the American Revolutionary War (Siege of Savannah).On May 3, 1783, as a reward for his “good service,” Jean-Louis was freed by his owner and superior for the sum of 300 livres tournois, and became Jean-Louis Annecy.

He attained the rank of captain in the first regiment of free troops in Cap-Haïtien Town and purchased land in the vicinity of the colonial capital.

On April 17, 1797 (Germinal Year V), Jean-Louis Annecy was elected representative to the Council of Ancients, the upper house of the French parliament under the Directory, and the last assembly to sit in the Tuileries Palace. He was an assiduous member of the second Society of the Friends of the Blacks.

In the aftermath of Coup of 18 Brumaire, Year VIII (September 9, 1799), Annecy was excluded from the Legislative Body, along with the entire delegation from Saint-Domingue. However, unlike Léger-Félicité Sonthonax and his accomplices Étienne Mentor and Claude Leborgne de Boigne , no arrest warrant was issued against him. He was therefore able to return to Saint-Domingue.

In 1802, during the Saint-Domingue expedition sent by Bonaparte to Saint-Domingue to restore the authority of the mother country and slavery, General Leclerc deported Annecy to the prison in Ajaccio, Corsica.

He was then transferred to the island of Elba, near Corsica, and placed under house arrest, where he died in 1807 at the age of 49.

== Sources and bibliography ==
- Observations d'Etienne Mentor et Jean Louis Anncy députés de Saint-Domingue. Sur l'opinion du Citoyen Brothier, Membre du Conseil des Anciens
- Liste des représentants du peuple, membres des deux conseils au 1er prairial Imprimerie nationale, 1798
- Conseil des Cinq-Cents / séance du 26 pluviôse. Compte-rendu
- Bernard Gainot « La députation de Saint-Domingue au corps législatif du Directoire » Outre-Mers. Revue d'histoire, 1997, 316 pp. 95–110] on Persée (web portal in history)
- Bernard Gainot Bernard Gainot Figures d'esclaves. Présence, paroles, représentation Chapter 4. Jean-Louis Annecy (vers 1758-vers 1807) : du Cap-Français aux Tuileries, des Tuileries au bagne, un parcours emblématique pp. 71–84

== See also ==
Jean-Baptiste Mills
