= Portrait of Jean-Baptiste Belley =

Painting by Anne-Louis Girodet de Roussy-Trioson

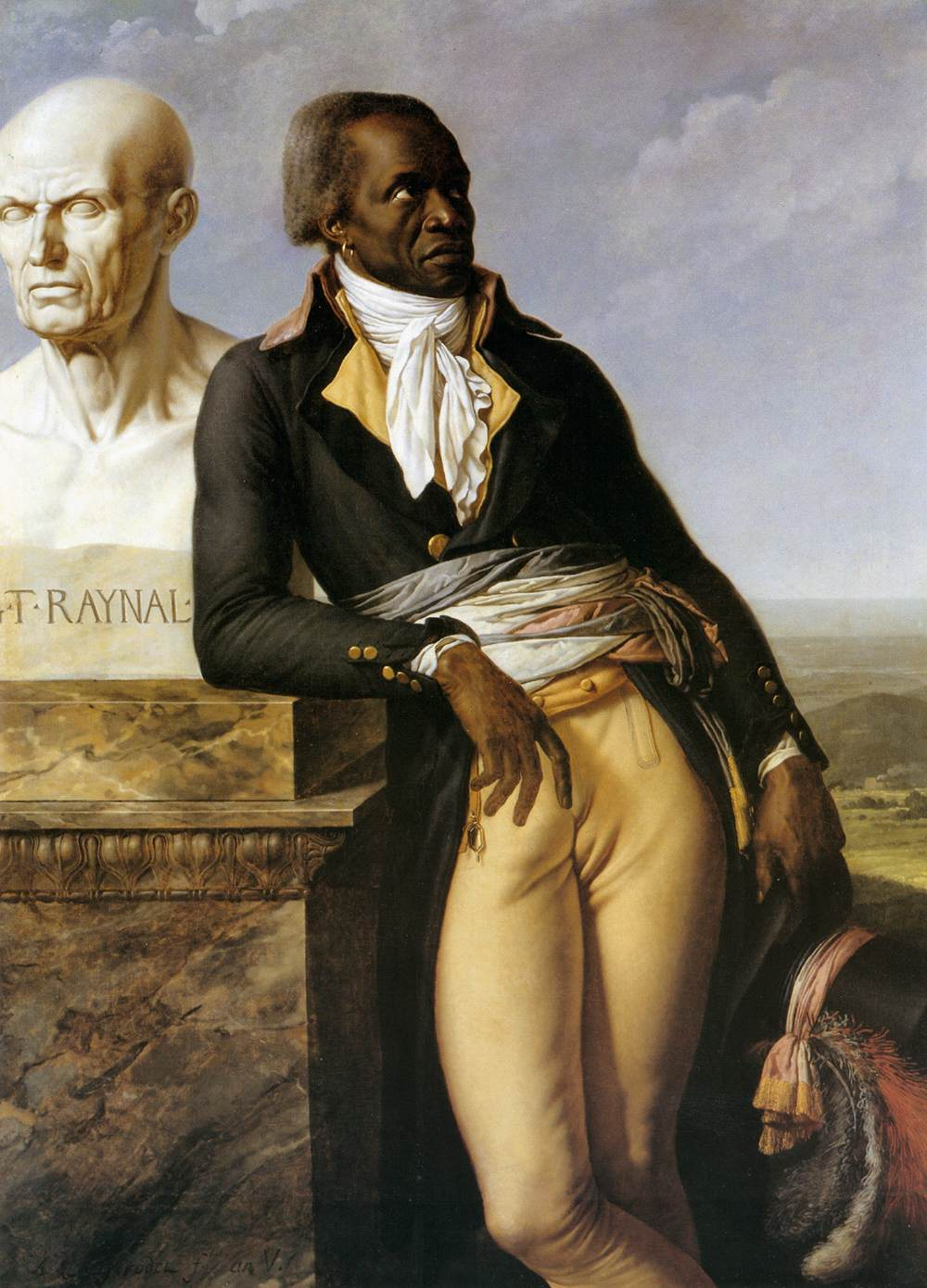
- Artist: Anne-Louis Girodet de Roussy-Trioson
- Year: 1797
- Type: Oil on canvas, portrait painting
- Dimensions: 159 cm × 113 cm (63 in × 44 in)
- Location: Palace of Versailles; Versailles

Portrait of Jean-Baptiste Belley is an oil on canvas portrait painting by the French artist Anne-Louis Girodet de Roussy-Trioson, from 1797. It depicts Jean-Baptiste Belley, a former slave from Saint-Domingue who was elected to serve in the National Convention following the French Revolution. He stands beside a bust of the French abolitionist Guillaume Thomas François Raynal. The composition resembles the artist's later Portrait of Chateaubriand.

== Description and analysis ==
In this painting, Girodet evokes the tensions of the period. Belley, standing, wears the uniform of a Convention member, with a tropical landscape behind him, and has a stylish relaxed pose, as favoured in many French political portraits of Revolutionary politicians. His elbow rests on a bust of the philosopher Guillaume Thomas François Raynal (1713–1796), author of A Philosophical and Political History of the Settlements and Trade of the Europeans in the East and West Indies (1770). Raynal, who had just died, had been a supporter of the abolition of slavery.

Scholars have noted that the painting foregrounds Belley's body, particularly the groin area, in ways that reinforce an 18th-century French racial stereotype associating Black men with sexual excess. According to art historian Darcy Grigsby, Belley was "an object of Girodet's desire and fantasy". She notes that in the painting, "the large penis is fantasmically touched by the hand whose spread fingers conjure its width and thereby permit the imagining of Belley's remarkable virility". Grigsby further argues that the sexualization is inseparable from the portrait's political project: Girodet's painting "accrues not only liberty and individual autonomy (...) but also the erotic charge generally withheld in abolitionist prints", which typically depicted Black men as "asexual or infantilized".

== Provenance ==
It was exhibited at the Salon of 1798 at the Louvre in Paris. On display in Toulon for several decades, it was acquired for the Louvre in 1828 for 3,000 Francs when it was believed to be a portrait of Toussaint Louverture. Today it is in the collection of the Palace of Versailles.

A drawing by Girodet for the portrait in ink and black chalk is in the Art Institute of Chicago, purchased with funds from the Joseph and Helen Regenstein Foundation in 1973.

== Cultural references ==
The portrait was used for the dust cover of Christopher Bayly's book The Birth of the Modern World 1780–1914: Global Connections and Comparisons (Oxford: Blackwell, 2004).

== Bibliography ==
- Grigsby, Darcy Grimaldo. Extremities: Painting Empire in Post-revolutionary France. Yale University Press, 2002.
- Palmer, Allison Lee. Historical Dictionary of Romantic Art and Architecture. Rowman & Littlefield, 2019.
- Rosenblum, Robert & Janson, Horst Woldemar. 19th-Century Art. Prentice Hall, 2005.
