= 1789 French legislative election in Saint-Domingue =

Estates General of 1789 election in Saint-Domingue
- 1789
- No seats authorized

An unauthorized election to the Estates General of 1789 was secretly held by white slaveholders in the French colony of Saint-Domingue, coinciding with the elections in metropolitan France. Frustrated by the lack of elected assemblies in the colony, they sought representation in the Estates General and aimed to protect their racial hierarchy from the abolitionist Society of the Friends of the Blacks and free people of color, including those who owned slaves themselves.

Although many free men of color met the property requirements to participate in the elections, they were denied the right to vote in almost all cases. A total of 17 deputies were elected, who produced a cahiers de doléances explicitly opposing the political integration of property-owning free men of color. In France, the delegation was rejected by the Second Estate, but was granted "provisional" admittance as members of the Third Estate, albeit without voting rights.

Nine of the deputies took the Tennis Court Oath and were absorbed "provisionally" into the National Assembly, which earned them a degree of sympathy from their fellow deputies. To avoid a discussion of the morality of slavery, the assembly compromised by granting the colony only six seats, two from each province, significantly lower than the 20 Louis Marthe de Gouy d'Arsy had sought for the delegation.

The elected deputies would go on to join forces with the white colonists in Paris to form the Massiac Club, an organization of planters dedicated to maintaining the system of slavery in the colony on the basis of laissez-faire economics. The club argued that colonists had the right to free commerce, which, in their view, included the use of slaves. Working in collaboration with the deputies, the club was able to convince Louis XVI in September to approve the creation of three colonial assemblies with policing and legislative powers.

== Background ==
The conclusion of the Seven Years' War significantly diminished France's colonial presence, leaving it with only a few overseas possessions in comparison to its European rivals. The war, largely driven by imperial ambitions, burdened the monarchy with substantial debt, contributing to the financial crisis that eventually led to the king calling for an Estates General. Ironically, it was also a time of unprecedented prosperity, particularly in Saint-Domingue, despite a growing number of poor and unemployed whites from Frenchmen attempting to seek fortune in the colony. Investment in the colony's sugar, coffee, and cotton plantations surged, nearly doubling the slave population from 1763 to 1789. By the time of the French Revolution, there were an estimated 700,000 slaves in the French Caribbean colonies, equal to that of the slave population in the United States. These enslaved laborers enabled the colony to produce as much sugar as Jamaica, Cuba, and Brazil combined, and about half of the global coffee market.

Similar to the colonists in British North America, French colonists grew increasingly resentful of metropolitan rule following the Seven Years' War, particularly due to policies like the exclusif, which restricted trade to only the mother country. This discontent led to a major revolt in 1768–1769, when the Council of Port-au-Prince led an uprising in the western and southern provinces of Saint-Domingue against "the pressure of the 'authoritarian monarchy'", paralysing the colony's government for a full year.

While white colonists grew increasingly frustrated with metropolitan France's oversight and economic restrictions, leaders among the free people of color, despite themselves owning slaves, and inspired by the American Revolutionary War, dispatched an emissary to Versailles to advocate for the abolition of racial distinctions between whites and free people of color, many of whom had served in the French forces during the war, gaining some sympathy from French officials. This development alarmed white slave owners, who perceived continued ministerial control as a potential threat to the established racial hierarchy and the institution of slavery on the island.

Following reports of small slave uprisings in the plantations of the colony, reform-minded administrators in the Colonial Ministry in Paris issued royal edicts in 1784 and 1785. These edicts, intended to curb the autonomy of plantation managers to protect the economic interests of absentee proprietors and metropolitan merchants in their constant quarrels with estate managers and debtors, and to restrict the mistreatment of slaves, further outraged the colonial white population. When the Conseil supérieur du Cap français refused to register the ordinance, it ignited a conflict between the local administrators and Versailles, leading to the French government abolishing the rebellious court in January 1787. Its powers were then transferred to Port-au-Prince. That same year, while Martinique and Guadeloupe were granted the right to establish colonial assemblies, Saint-Domingue was excluded from that privilege.

This situation led the circulation of several proposals in France to give the whites of the colony control over their own affairs, and in the spring of 1788, a delegation headed by the well-known expert on colonial affairs, Médéric Louis Élie Moreau de Saint-Méry, was sent to France, where he contacted some of the wealthy absentee plantation owners residing in Paris.

== Campaign ==
The decision on 5 July 1788, to call for an election of representatives to the Estates General, presented an opportunity for both the Society of the Friends of the Blacks, a French abolitionist society, and the plantation owners of Saint-Domingue. The Friends of the Blacks used the opportunity to distribute an essay written by the Marquis de Condorcet that called for the French nation to pay attention to the slave trade and improve the lives of slaves to each of the hundreds of districts electing deputies. As a result, 49 of the cahiers de doléances included criticisms of the slave trade or slavery. The Friends of Blacks also lobbied Jacques Necker, the king's liberal finance minister, to end state subsidies for slave traders. Although Necker's own background was linked to the colonial economy, he was sympathetic to their cause. In his address at the opening of the Estates General in June 1789, Necker called on delegates to consider the suffering of enslaved Africans, describing them as "men like us in their thoughts and above all in their capacity to suffer," who were cruelly transported across the Atlantic in ship hulls. The movement would lose momentum as its leaders became preoccupied with other issues raised by the summoning of the Estates General.

In July 1788, a group of French colonial planters formed the Colonial Committee in Paris. The initiative was led by Louis Marthe de Gouy d'Arsy, an ambitious absentee landowner who, despite never having set foot in Saint-Domingue, would come to dominate the committee's activities. The planters were outraged by the abolition of the council, sought representation in the Estates General, which some in the group feared would bring the colony under the control of the Estates General, where antislavery forces would likely find voice, and sought to maintain unlimited authority over their slaves. However, to prevent public opinion from turning against them, their official letter to the king avoided overt references to slavery. Instead, they argued that Saint-Domingue had become "the most valuable province of France" despite oppressive and inconsistent royal administration, and therefore deserved representation in the Estates General, particularly with the status of nobles.

To sway public opinion, they presented the matter of justice and political rights. In doing so, the defenders of slavery strategically adopted the same rights-based language employed by anti-slavery activists and political reformers in France who were calling for representative government. By pushing for the creation of a colonial assembly and the right to elect deputies, the colonial planters aligned themselves rhetorically with the provinces of France that were, during the summer of 1788, openly challenging royal authority and asserting their own political autonomy. Additionally, recognizing the importance of printed propaganda but lacking the talent to write their own appeals, the group began to hire pens to counteract anti-slavery opinions. One of the individuals they attempted to recruit, even calling him the best writer they had, was Honoré Gabriel Riqueti, comte de Mirabeau. Although he had previously published British anti-slavery tracts in his paper, he was desperate for money and eager for a seat in the Estates General, not immediately rejecting the idea of defending the colonists. However, realizing that he would need to become a slave owner to represent them in the Estates-General, likely led to him severing ties with the group.

At the same meeting on 25 October in which Mirabeau was offered to be one of their representatives, the group debated whether colonial administrator Pierre Victor, baron Malouet should publish a pamphlet openly defending slavery. The group ultimately advised Malouet to postpone publication until after the Estates General had convened and formally granted representation to the colonies. Malouet replied by stressing the urgency of countering Condorcet's pamphlet. He also cautioned the committee against raising colonial grievances that might be poorly received in metropolitan France, specifically recommending that they refrain from criticizing the exclusif.

In late summer and fall of 1788, white colonists who supported Saint-Domingue's representation in the Estates General began preparations to elect deputies, despite lacking authorization from the royal administration. Meanwhile, the Colonial Committee continued to lobby royal ministers and other influential figures. Marie-Charles du Chilleau, the colony's governor-general, met with the group but informed them that the Estates General did not concern Saint-Domingue. On 4 September 1788, César-Henri, comte de La Luzerne, the minister responsible for the colonies, told them that he would need to consult the king before taking any action. In his correspondence with the king, La Luzerne expressed doubts about whether the group truly represented the views of most whites in the colony and stated that no other European country had granted its colonies such a privilege, adding that if the king decided the question on his own, he would be overstepping the authority of the Estates General. On 11 September 1788, the royal council formally declined to invite the colonies to the Estates General. Efforts by the group to emphasize the colony's importance were all shot down by the royal administration, which went so far as to forbid the Nobles from considering the matter.

== Election ==
With no other options left, the pro-representation faction within Saint-Domingue proceeded with its unauthorized plan and secretly elected deputies. In nearly all cases, free men of color, even those who met the property requirements for voting in the Estates General, were denied the right to vote. The cahiers produced by the delegates explicitly opposed the political integration of property-owning free men of color. In total, 17 delegates were elected, some of whom, like Gouy, were absentee landowners. By the beginning of April, the colonial delegates residing in Saint-Domingue were en route to France. In France, 14 of the cahiers produced by the various districts mentioned the question of representation for the colonies, while six mentioned colonial trade regulations.

== Aftermath ==
On 8 June 1789, the Saint-Domingue delegates formally presented their request for admittance to the three estates, which was protested by the Friends of the Blacks as they had been illegitimately elected. The delegates warned that otherwise, France would have to answer the problem of colonial representation with "arms in its hands" as had happened decades before to Britain. The First Estate ignored them, while the Second Estate rejected it, as, despite colonial proprietors having noble titles in France, noble status and privileges had never been recognized in Saint-Domingue. The Third Estate, amid a conflict with the other estates over whether voting should be done by head, and not having yet verified the credentials of its own members, declined to make a formal decision, but allowed them to be provisionally admitted without voting rights.

Nine of the deputies took the Tennis Court Oath and were absorbed "provisionally" into the National Assembly, which earned them a degree of sympathy from their fellow deputies. To avoid a discussion of the morality of slavery, the assembly compromised by granting the colony only six seats, two from each province, significantly lower than the 20 Gouy had sought for the delegation.

The elected deputies would go on to join forces with the white colonists in Paris to form the Massiac Club, an organization of planters dedicated to maintaining the system of slavery in the colony on the basis of laissez-faire economics. The club argued that colonists had the right to free commerce, which, in their view, included the use of slaves. Working in collaboration with the deputies, the club was able to convince Louis XVI in September to approve the creation of three colonial assemblies with policing and legislative powers.

== Works cited ==
- Popkin, Jeremy (2011). "Saint-Domingue, Slavery and the Origins of the French Revolution". In Kaiser, Thomas; Kley, Dale Van (eds.). From Deficit to Deluge: The Origins of the French Revolution. Stanford University Press. ISBN 9780804772815.
- DUBOIS, Laurent (2009). Avengers of the New World: The Story of the Haitian Revolution. Harvard University Press. ISBN 9780674034365.
