= Self-denying Ordinance (French Revolution) =

1791 resolution of the French Constituent Assembly

During the French Revolution the Constituent Assembly, elected in 1789, passed a self-denying ordinance barring any member from sitting in its successor, the Legislative Assembly convened in 1791.

== History ==
The National Constituent Assembly dissolved itself on 30 September 1791. Upon Maximilien de Robespierre's motion it decreed that none of its members should be capable of sitting in the next legislature; this is known as the self-denying ordinance. Its successor body, the Legislative Assembly, operating under the liberal French Constitution of 1791, did not last a year and was generally deemed a failure. It left behind an empty treasury, an undisciplined army and navy, and enormous domestic turmoil.
