= 1796 French legislative election in Saint-Domingue =

- North: 8–11 September 1796; South: April 1796
- 13 deputies for election

Elections to the Corps législatif were held in the French colony of Saint-Domingue in 1796. In the north, elections took place from 8 to 11 September, following primary elections called for by Commissioner Léger-Félicité Sonthonax. A total of 118 electors convened in Le Cap, where they reelected the deputies already serving in Paris, as well as several new deputies, including Sonthonax and interim governor Étienne Maynaud de Bizefranc de Laveaux, the only two whites with any popularity among the black population. Both men were pressured by General Toussaint Louverture to be deputies in France, in an attempt to consolidate his own position within the colony.

According to 1800s Haitian historian Thomas Madiou, a separate election was organized in the south in April by André Rigaud and fellow southern general Louis-Jacques Beauvais in an attempt to undermine Laveaux and Sonthonax. Most of the deputies elected were unable to depart in September as scheduled, while those who did were captured by the British.

The elected deputies from the north were initially unable to take their seats as the Clichy Club, led by its main colonial spokesperson, planter Vincent-Marie Viénot, Count of Vaublanc, convinced the legislature to annul both the 1796 and 1797 elections. According to them, the elections had not been conducted in accordance with the constitution, but under prior electoral regulations. They accused Laveaux, Sonthonax, and Louverture of having rigged the vote, claiming it was dictated by military despotism. Furthermore, they criticized emancipation, alleging it had led to, and was used to justify, unprecedented violence against whites in the colony, rendering it unprofitable.

The offensive by the Clichyens was cut short with the Coup of 18 Fructidor. On the day of the coup, a commission met, which validated the deputation a week later. Due to the conditions of their admittance, the representatives were attached to the "fructidorien current", with several of them clearly proclaiming their commitment to the "union of republicans" against the supporters of the royalist restoration, among whom were the most determined of their opponents. Several of them also aligned with the neo-Jacobin left.

Elected representatives from the South, Pinchinat and Rey Delmas, also took steps to obtain their approval. A new commission met in January 1798 to examine their case, concluding on 27 April 1798, that the elections in the Southern and Western departments should be annulled.

== Background ==
In 1794, white colonists who had been deported from Saint-Domingue successfully lobbied for the arrest and recall of Léger-Félicité Sonthonax and his fellow commissioners, accusing them of "tyrannizing the citizens." No new commissioners were appointed in their place, nor was any aid dispatched to the embattled French forces on the island, unlike the British and Spanish governments, which continued to support their own invading troops, leaving French forces in total isolation. The French government was "apparently too busy digesting the implications of the fall of Robespierre to concern themselves with Saint-Domingue."

Despite this apathy, French forces would make gains against the invaders under Toussaint Louverture, commander of French forces in the northern province, who had recently abandoned the Spanish and British for the sake of "liberty and equality", and André Rigaud, a free man of color hostile towards both blacks and whites, who was governor of the southern province. Though both men were nominally subordinate to interim governor Étienne Maynaud de Bizefranc de Laveaux, they were effectively under their own jurisdiction.

In July 1795, Spain signed the Peace of Basel, ceding its share of the island to France and withdrawing along with insurgent leaders Jean-François and Biassou, Louverture's main rivals, some of whose troops joined his ranks. That same month, at Laveaux's request, Toussaint, Rigaud, Bauvais, and Villatte were promoted to the rank of general. By November, Rigaud had expelled the British from large portions of the south and west, creating a secure territory for people of color. He also continued to enforce the regulations imposed by Commissioner Étienne Polverel, keeping blacks working on their former plantations, making his region the only part of the colony where trade with American merchants still persisted.

In metropole, the Constitution of the Year III had been implemented, establishing the Directory and changing the electoral laws to reintroduce property requirements to vote, effectively disenfranchising most of those who had been enfranchised with the abolition of slavery. In late January 1796, turning their attention back to the colonies, the Directory dispatched a new commission headed by Sonthonax, along with 1,200 men, to restore confidence in the Republic and ensure that France would profit from abolition by returning the former slaves to work. While white colonists disliked Sonthonax, he was one of the few white people that was popular among former slaves, a group whose cooperation would be essential to France's success in the colony.

That same year witnessed escalating racial tensions among the racial groups of the colony. The hostility between blacks and whites stemmed from the memory of slavery under them, while tensions between free men of color and the black population were rooted in the belief among the former that they were the rightful heirs to the colony, having long occupied a racial caste above the enslaved. Once seen as vital allies of the Republic, free men of color now found themselves blamed for every setback, a reversal that bred deep resentment and suspicion. Many believed they had remained consistently loyal to France and upheld republican ideals, only to be scapegoated. In particular, they felt threatened by Louverture's close relationship with the governor. Meanwhile, among the black population, fears persisted that the free men of color might try to reinstate slavery.

On 26 March 1797, Jean-Louis Villatte, commandant of Le Cap, recognizing the threat that Louverture posed to the desire among many free men of color to declare independence, attempted a coup. He was suspicious of both the French authorities and Louverture for siding with the newly freed slaves, whom he and others believed were negatively affecting colonial commerce. Aware of the plot, Louverture had his men intercept Villatte when he decided to attack, freeing Laveaux, who had been held captive for two days. For his service, Laveaux named Louverture lieutenant governor. Afterwards, relations briefly improved as Commissioner Philippe Roume, appointed by the Directory to oversee former Spanish lands, convinced the leaders that reconciliation was in their best interest.

The commissioners arrived in May and first sought to rein in the powers of the generals, more immediately the men of color, arresting Villatte and his major supporters and deporting them to France. Additionally, they accused the men of color of exploiting the blacks and Jean-Baptiste Donatien de Vimeur, comte de Rochambeau wrote to France warning that "the men of color are loudly announcing projects for independence".

Sonthonax's harsh and rapid response only deepened resentment among the free people of color, many of whom had similar aspirations. To keep the colony under French control, Sonthonax sought to secure the loyalty of leaders like Rigaud and the broader free colored population, who had, up to that point, remained faithful to France. In an attempt to ensure the continuation of this loyalty, Sonthonax dispatched three envoys to the southern province, but only served to alienate Rigaud by making sweeping changes to administration, detaining his allies, and repeatedly accusing him of not fully embracing republican ideals. By the end of the summer, he had severed ties with France entirely and had begun pursuing an independent course. As a result, Sonthonax's representatives were forced to abandon their efforts to secure the south for the Republic. In the north, Sonthonax focused on maintaining Louverture's allegiance, granting his request to send his two sons to France for their education, elevating him as the successor to Laveaux as commander-in-chief of Saint-Domingue, and placing him in charge of the western region.

== Prelude ==
On 6 August, Sonthonax called for primary elections to take place in the north. According to Jeremy D. Popkin, Louverture used this opportunity to get rid of white officials who stood in his way, specifically Laveaux and Sonthonax, the only two whites on the island with any popularity among the black population. While also clearly pursuing his own ambitions, he had grown deeply distrustful of any future French government's commitment to the abolition of slavery, concluding that the only way to ensure that emancipation would not be reversed was to place a black leader, like himself, in charge of the colony.

Arguing that he would better defend the freedom of the Black population in France than in the colony, Louverture persuaded Laveaux to stand as a deputy, a move that would elevate Louverture to commanding general of the French forces there. Confident of success, he assured Laveaux that he would send "trustworthy men" to persuade the electors that his election would secure the "happiness of the Blacks". Sonthonax, while he would send a letter to the assembly accepting his nomination, was more reluctant to leave.

=== Primaries ===
According to the law, primary elections should've begun on 21 March in each canton of the colony to select electors for the electoral assembly in their department, a justice of the peace, and a president or municipal officers for their municipality, followed by the convening of said electoral assemblies on 9 April. Due to the lack of information, it's uncertain whether the elections were conducted in accordance with the Constitution of Year III, but if they had, then only men over 21 who were listed on the civic register in their canton and who either paid a direct or personal property tax or had served for the republic would have been considered citizens, and therefore eligible to vote in the primary elections. Each primary assembly was to select electors based on the number of eligible voters in their canton, one elector for 200-300 voters, two for 300–500, three for 500–700, so on. These electors, in turn, had to be men at least 25 meeting a property or income qualification, which varied depending on the size of their canton.

Of the 97 primary assemblies, 29 convened between 18 August and 1 September, comprising around 24,200 eligible voters. The restrictions imposed by the new constitution effectively barred most former slaves from voting. These assemblies selected 118 electors in total, each chosen by an absolute majority.

== Elections ==
=== South ===
According to 1800s Haitian historian Thomas Madiou, separate primary elections had already occurred in April, organized by Rigaud and fellow southern general Louis-Jacques Beauvais following the defeat of the British forces at Léogâne. Although Riguad had not yet officially received the new constitution, he held elections anyway, seeking to undermine Laveaux and Sonthonax. He planned to send his aide-de-camp, Bonnet, to accompany the deputies to Paris, where he would accuse Sonthonax of attempting to separate the colony from France. Rigaud aimed to exploit the conservative shift in Paris and appeared to advocate for a return to slavery in order to restore the island's former profitability.

Two electoral assemblies were convened, one in Léogâne for the western province and another in Les Cayes for the southern province. The deputies elected for the west were Rey Delmas and Fontaine. The deputies elected for the south were Sala, white; Decand, white; George Pierre, black; Daniel Gélec, mixed; Pinchinat, mixed; and Raimond, mixed. These deputies were not scheduled to depart until September, when the electoral assembly in Le Cap was already convening. By that time, Sala had been killed, and all the southern deputies, except for Pinchinat, were unable to leave. Pinchinat joined the western deputies, along with Garigou and Rénéum, who had been appointed commissioners of the commune, but were captured by the British en route to Paris.

According to historian Bernard Gainot, the assembly at Léogâne elected four officials with 107 electors present. Additionally, elections were held on 12 September 1796 with 25 electors in Les Cayes, which were conducted in accordance with the Constitution of the Year III. Here, four white settlers were elected, including Brulley, Thomas Millet, and Yon Pauliau.

=== North ===
The electoral assembly convened in Le Cap on 7 September, with only electors from 23 of the 29 cantons in attendance, who were admitted by the president. The electors from the other cantons arrived in later sessions, at which time they were admitted. The following day, the assembly began voting to elect deputies, whose number had been increased to 13 under the new constitution. The deputies already serving in Paris were reelected. On 9 September, 39 deputies who had been nominated by departments in the metropole were confirmed. On 10 September, "Citizen Chaunany", (Note: Levecq does not mention "Citizen Chaunany" but a black man named Pierre Thomany.) an elector for Le Cap, was elected, followed by Sonthonax. The next day, Laveaux, François Pétiniaud, a mixed elector for Beynet, Martin Noël Brothier, a white elector for Petite Rivière de l'Artibonite, and Louis François Boisrond, a mixed elector for Acquin, were elected. On 12 September, Citizen Barbaut was elected as high juror of Saint-Domingue. The assembly concluded its work on 13 September, when Barbaut accepted his nomination.

According to Gainot, Pierre Antoine fils, black, and Antoine Chanlatte jeune, a mixed-race general, were also elected but never sat.

== Aftermath ==
=== Annulment ===
When the deputation arrived in France, they were unable to take their seats due to a campaign by the Clichy Club, led by its main colonial spokesperson, planter Vincent-Marie Viénot, Count of Vaublanc. The Club sought to annul both their election and, later, the 1797 election. According to them, the elections had not been conducted in accordance with the constitution, but under prior electoral regulations. They accused Laveaux, Sonthonax, and Louverture of having rigged the vote, claiming it was dictated by military despotism. Furthermore, they criticized emancipation, alleging it had led to, and was used to justify, unprecedented violence against whites in the colony, rendering it unprofitable. Benefitting from the right-wing majority produced by the April 1797 elections in France, the legislature annulled the elections, basing their decisions on the irregularities.

The offensive by the Clichyens was cut short with the Coup of 18 Fructidor. On the day of the coup, a commission composed of Grégoire, Salicetti, Bergœing, and Joseph Eschassériaux met, which validated the deputation a week later. The representatives were divided between the two councils, partly according to their age, partly to respect the balance of races. In the Council of Ancients, Laveaux, Brothier, Vergniaud, Petiniaud, Annecy, (Note: Gainot lists Annecy as being on the Council of 500.) Tonnelier were seated. In the Council of Five Hundred, Sonthonax, Leborgne, Boisrond, Mentor, and Thomany were seated. They joined the former members of the convention, whose powers had been extended: the whites Dufay and Garnot, the mixed Mills and Laforest, the blacks Belley and Boisson. The deputation of Saint-Domingue was therefore composed of seventeen people, six blacks, seven whites, and four mixed. Due to the conditions of their admittance, the representatives were attached to the "fructidorien current", with several of them clearly proclaiming their commitment to the "union of republicans" against the supporters of the royalist restoration, among whom were the most determined of their opponents. Several of them also aligned with the neo-Jacobin left.

Elected representatives from the South, Pinchinat and Rey Delmas, also took steps to obtain their approval. A new commission met in January 1798 to examine their case. Eschassériaux sat on it again, alongside Garran-Coulon and Quirot, with Cholet serving as rapporteur. It concluded, on 27 April 1798, that the elections in the Southern and Western departments should be annulled.

=== Sonthonax ===
Sonthonax, who had frequently clashed with Louverture over various issues, was reluctant to leave the colony. Throughout most of 1797, he remained in Saint-Domingue, encouraged by many black residents of the northern province who urged him to stay. This changed with the results of the 1797 French legislative election, in which counterrevolutionary forces made major gains. Many of the new deputies called for the dismissal of Sonthonax, restoration of order in the colony, and even the return of slavery. On 20 August 1797, Louverture and several of his generals sent Sonthonax a peremptory letter declaring, "go tell France what you have seen, the prodigies you have witnessed. Be always the defender of the cause we have embraced, for which we shall be eternal soldiers." Confronted with this ultimatum, Sonthonax finally abandoned his resistance and returned to Paris. At the same time, Louverture wrote to the Directory accusing Sonthonax of having sought to separate the colony from France, while also refuting arguments by those who sought to reinstate slavery.

== Works cited ==
- Dubois, Laurent (2009). Avengers of the New World. Cambridge, MA: Harvard University Press. ISBN 9780674034365.
- Gaffney, Jennifer Ann (23 April 2014). Citizenship and Emancipation: Voting Rights during the Haitian Revolution after 1793 (Thesis). hdl:1969.1/152862.
- Figures d'esclaves : présences, paroles, représentations (in French). Presses universitaires de Rouen et du Havre. 2012. doi:10.4000/books.purh.6233. ISBN 978-2-87775-552-8.
- Gainot, Bernard (20 January 2025). "Les représentants de couleur de Saint-Domingue dans les assemblées de la Première République". La Révolution française (in French) (27). doi:10.4000/13467. ISSN 2105-2557.
- Gainot, Bernard (1997). "La députation de Saint-Domingue au corps législatif du Directoire". Revue française d'histoire d'outre-mer (in French). 84 (316). PERSEE Program: 95–110. doi:10.3406/outre.1997.3577. ISSN 0300-9513.
- Levecq, Christine (2019). "Jean-Baptiste Belley and French Republicanism". Black Cosmopolitans: Race, Religion, and Republicanism in an Age of Revolution. University of Virginia Press. ISBN 9780813942193.
- Popkin, Jeremy D. (16 November 2021). A Concise History of the Haitian Revolution. Hoboken, NJ: John Wiley & Sons. ISBN 9781119746331.
