= Jean-Baptiste Mills =

Haitian politician

Jean-Baptiste Mills (1 July 1749 – 7 December 1806) was a politician from Saint-Domingue who served in the French Parliament from 1793 to 1795. He was born in Cap-Haïtien and died in Bastia, Corsica (he was deported in Corsica by Napoleon Bonaparte)

== See also ==
- fr:Déportés guadeloupéens et haïtiens en Corse
- Jean-Louis Annecy
