= Étienne Mentor =

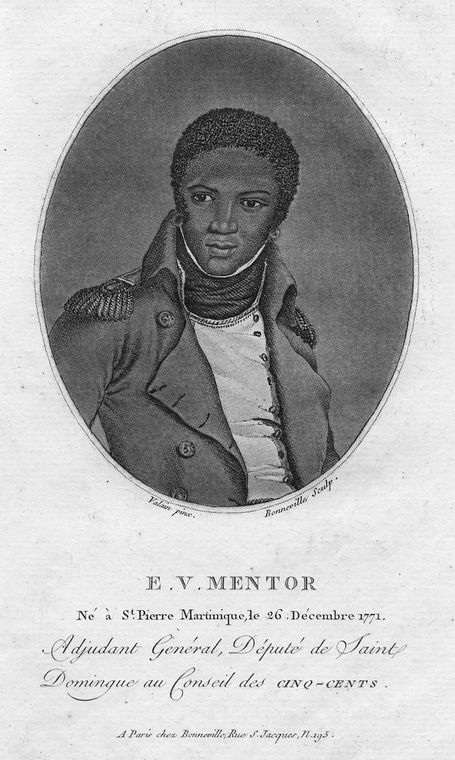
Portrait of E. V. Mentor, stipple engraving by Francois Bonneville (after Valain), 1802.

Étienne Victor Mentor (26 December 1771 in Saint-Pierre, Martinique – after 1804) was a politician from Martinique who served and represented Saint-Domingue (now Haiti) in the French parliament from 1797-1799.

He was adjutant-general when elected a member of the Council of Five Hundred on 22 Germinal V year of the Republic, by 56 votes of 74 voters. He made a speech expressing the attachment of the negro population to the Republic and their fidelity to the Constitution of Year III. On 30 July 1798 he spoke to demand payment of amounts due to the settlers or refugees deported, on 16 October to demonstrate for the abolition of slavery and request the deletion of claims relating to the sale of slaves, on 28 April 1799 to denounce Perrotin, another deputy for Saint-Domingue, who had called the British to the island. He voted, as the coup d'État of 18 Brumaire neared, the motion that the "fatherland was in danger", and was expelled from the legislature on the 18th of Brumaire. Exiled in Paris, he obtained permission to travel to the colonies, and in 1801 sailed from Brest. During this trip, he rescued a sailor lost overboard. He returned to France in 1803, and was able to stay on condition of remaining thirty leagues from Paris. Back in Haiti in 1804, he became aide-de-camp to Jean-Jacques Dessalines, then passed under the command of Alexandre Pétion. No further news of him is found thereafter.

== Published speeches ==
- Observations d'Étienne Mentor et Jean-Louis Annecy, députés de Saint-Domingue, sur l'opinion du citoyen Brothier, membre du Conseil des Anciens de Jean-Louis Annecy. An VI de la République (= 1798)
- Dernier mot d'Étienne Mentor, représentant du peuple,... à Étienne Bruix, ministre de la Marine et des colonies. 21 ventôse, An VII de la République (= 1799)
- Demande adressée aux représentants du peuple composant le Conseil des Cinq-Cents, par Étienne Mentor, élu représentant du peuple par l'Assemblée électorale de Saint-Domingue tenue au Cap français, le 20 germinal. An V de la République, en vue d'être admis au Conseil des Cinq-Cents de Étienne Mentor (1797)
