= Massiac Club =

Parisian political club during the French Revolution

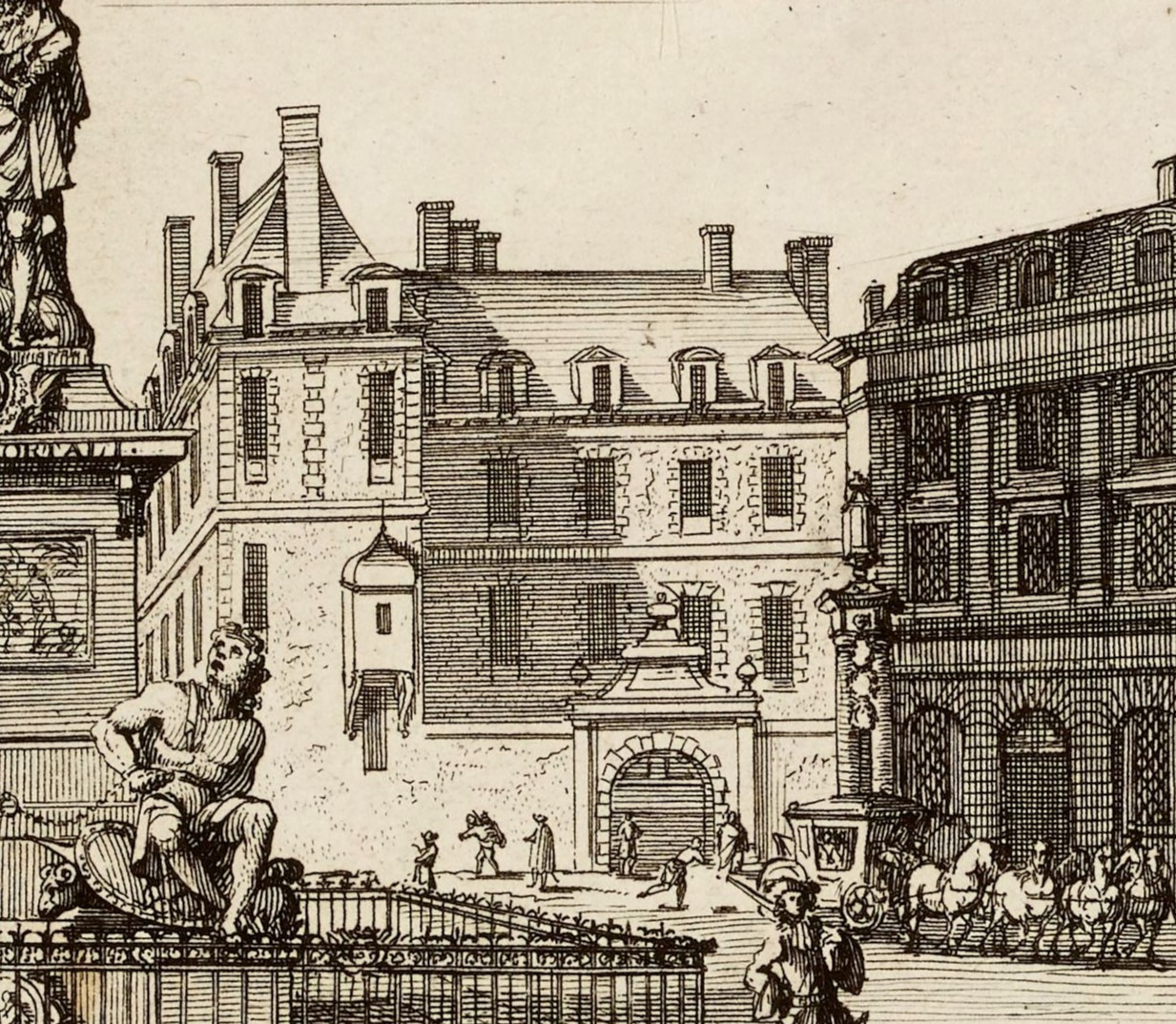
The hôtel de Massiac

Club de l'hôtel de Massiac or the Massiac Club was a political club in Paris in France during the French Revolution. The club was formed on 20 August 1789 and dissolved after the Haitian Revolution in August 1791.

It was situated in the Hotel Massiac in Paris, hence its name. It was a counter-revolutionary club composed of slave owning planters from the French Antilles with the purpose of promoting their interests in the French parliament, particularly in regards to the issue of slavery, and to lobby against the implementation of the Declaration of the Rights of Man and of the Citizen and the abolition of slavery in the colonies, while also working against the abolitionist Society of the Friends of the Blacks. Through pro-slavery parliamentary lobbying, the club delayed the implementation of the rights introduced in Paris for a long time.

== Club at Hotel Massiac - Lobbying in favour of slavery ==
Louis-Claude-René de Mordant (1746-1806), who styled himself Marquis of Massiac, owned a private mansion, formerly Hôtel de Pomponne, located Place des Victoires in Paris. He inherited it in 1770 from his great-uncle, Claude-Louis d'Espinchal, the Minister of the Navy.

In 1787, Brissot had founded the Society of the Friends of the Blacks, which wanted to abolish the slave trade in the colonies. From 20 August 1789, a “White Settlers’ Club” began to meet at the Hotel Massiac, the mansion of the Marquis of Massiac, in order to combat the influence of the Society of the Friends of the Blacks.

The Massiac Club of White Settlers initially brought together 70 members, all slave owners in Saint-Domingue or the Lesser Antilles, and had more than 400 members during the 1791 debate in the Assembly on the colonies.

== Opposition to the Society of Friends of Blacks ==
Since 15 July 1789, a first assembly of "settlers residing in Paris" met at the initiative of Louis-Marthe de Gouy d'Arsy in order to obtain the representation of the colonies in the Assembly and the creation in the colonies of colonial assemblies exercising local political control. The club created correspondence companies in ports. This was to prevent the Assembly from taking measures hindering the interests of the settlers. The Massiac club was dominated by personalities, like Gouy d'Arsy, from the nobility and holders of immense fortunes in Saint-Domingue, as well as by the Martinican Creole Médéric Louis Élie Moreau de Saint-Méry, theoretician of the club.

The group relied in the Assembly on Malouet, Barnave, as well as on Alexandre de Lameth.

In his Monday session of 8 March 1790, Sieur Barnave, rapporteur of the Colonial Committee, read a report on the work of this committee, then submitted to the Assembly a draft decree whose preamble declared that:

"Considering the colonies as a part of the French empire and desiring them to enjoy the happy regeneration which has taken place there, she however never intended to include them in the Constitution which she decreed for the kingdom, and to subject them to laws which could be incompatible with their local conveniences or particulars”.

Six articles followed which indicated the means for each colony to equip itself with the administration which 'best suited' its prosperity and that of its inhabitants by conforming to the principles which bound the colonies to the metropolis by "ensuring the conservation of their respective interests". The Massiac Club campaigned against the equality rights of free men of colour as well as against the most active defenders of equality rights. As such, the club accused Abbé Grégoire of acting under the improper influence of his brother who was married to a woman of colour.

== The claim for twenty seats in the Estates-General ==
Based on the demographic weight of Saint-Domingue, including slaves, the delegation claimed to obtain twenty seats in the Estates General. The representation of Saint-Domingue was finally reduced to six, but the question of the status of men was raised, opening a breach in the system of slavery.

After the slave revolt of 1791 (Haitian Revolution), many planters fled the island and formed French refugee communities of Saint-Domingue in America, especially in the southern parts of the United States, where the center of gravity of the settler lobby moved.

Louis Marthe de Gouy d'Arsy was guillotined, but other orators and elected officials from Saint-Domingue settled in Philadelphia, the US capital of the time, such as Denis Nicolas Cottineau de Kerloguen.

== Main members ==
- Yves Cormier (1740-1805), secretary then president of the Massiac Club, as well as the Monarchist Club; previously prosecutor of the king at the Presidial of Rennes. He was the son of Yves-Gille Cormier, a merchant, general farmer of the bishopric of Rennes, and alderman of the city.
- Louis Claude René de Mordant (1746-1806), known as the Marquis de Massiac. His father, Louis Mordant, ennobled in 1759, master advisor at the Court of Auditors of Rouen, had amassed a very large fortune thanks to commercial speculation within the Caribbean.
- Louis Marthe de Gouy d'Arsy, deputy of the nobility of Saint-Domingue in the Estates General of 1789
- Médéric Louis Élie Moreau de Saint-Méry, Creole settler, scholar, slave owner, club theorist and inventor of the concept of "aristocracy of the epidermis".
- Alexandre de Lameth, initially a member of the Society of Friends of Blacks
- Charles-Malo de Lameth, brother of Alexandre de Lameth.

== Bibliography ==
Augustin Challamel, Les Clubs contre-révolutionnaires : cercles, comités, sociétés, salons, réunions, cafés, restaurants et librairies, [Counter-revolutionary Clubs: circles, committees, societies, salons, meetings, cafes, restaurants and bookstores], Paris, L. Cerf,1895, pp. 633

Gabriel Debien, Colons de Saint-Domingue et la Révolution : essai sur le club Massiac (août 1789-août 1792) [The Colonists of Saint-Domingue and the Revolution: Essay on the Massiac club (August 1789-August 1792)], Paris, Armand Colin,1953, pp. 414

Jacques Thibau, Le Temps de Saint-Domingue : l’esclavage et la Révolution française [The Times of Saint-Domingue: slavery and the French Revolution], Paris, Jean-Claude Lattès, 1989, pp. 384

Déborah Liébart, Un groupe de pression contre-révolutionnaire: le club Massiac sous la Constituante [A counter-revolutionary pressure group: the Massiac club under the Constituent Assembly], Annales historiques de la révolution française [Historical Annals of the French Revolution], Paris, October–December 2008, p. 29–50

== See also ==
- Haitian Revolution
- Racism and Racism in France
- Colonialism, French Colonialism, and Saint-Domingue
- Declaration of the Rights of Man and of the Citizen
- Slavery and Abolitionism
- Society of the Friends of the Blacks
