= Roger d'Argences =

French abbot (died 1139)

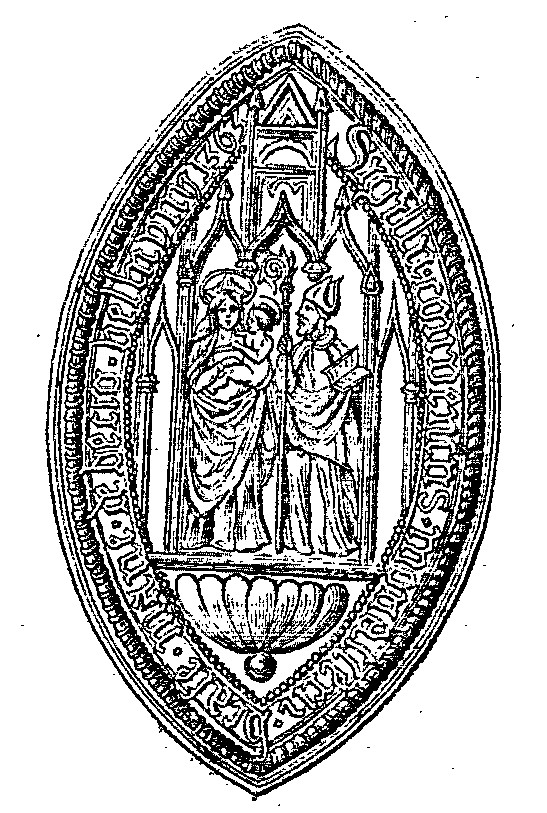
Seal of Bec Abbey:.

Roger of Argences or Roger d'Argences (died 1139), also known as Roger de Bayeux (Latin: Rogerius Baiocensis), was the fourth abbot of Fécamp Abbey, appointed in 1107.

== Biography ==
Originally from Argences in the diocese of Bayeux, he had a nephew Roger, chaplain to the king.

He was a monk at the royal abbey of Fécamp located near Rouen where he was a disciple of Abbot William of Rots. He was ordained a priest on Saint Thomas' Day 1107 at Rouen Cathedral by Guillaume Bonne-Âme, Archbishop of Rouen, with 120 others, including Orderic Vitalis. He was appointed abbot of Fécamp in the same year.

In 1115 he was a witness to a diploma from Henry I in favour of Abingdon Abbey. He attended the councils of Rouen in 1118 and 1128 and the council of Reims in 1119.

Pope Innocent II issued a papal bull on 17 June 1136, placing Fécamp Abbey under papal protection and confirming its possessions and privileges.

In 1136, Roger gave 100 marcs of silver for Geoffrey Plantagenet, Count of Anjou, to spare Argences.

He exchanged letters with Herbert de Losinga, former prior of Fécamp, who had become bishop of Norwich.

Baudri of Bourgueil, who held him in great esteem, visited Fécamp many times and composed a poem about the abbey.

Roger died on 22 March 1139 and was buried in Saint Martin's chapel of the abbey church.
