= Melanius =

Melanius may refer to:

- Saint Melaine, also spelled Melanius, 6th century bishop of Rennes
- Saint Melanius I of Viviers, 5th century bishop of the Roman Catholic Diocese of Viviers
- Saint Melanius II of Viviers, 6th century bishop of the Roman Catholic Diocese of Viviers

== See also ==
- Saint Mellonius (229–314), possibly fictitious bishop of Rotomagus
