= Privilege of St Romain =

Since the year 1156, the chapter of Rouen, (which consisted of the archbishop, a dean, fifty canons, and ten prebendaries), had the annual privilege of pardoning, on Ascension day, some individual confined within the jurisdiction of the city for murder. On the morning of Ascension day, the chapter, having heard many examinations and confessions read, proceeded to the election of the criminal who was to be pardoned; and, the choice being made, his name was transmitted in writing to the parliament, which assembled on that day at the palace. The parliament then walked in procession to the great chamber, where the prisoner was brought before them in irons, and placed on a stool; he was informed that the choice had fallen upon him, and that he was entitled to the privilege of St. Romain.

After these preliminaries, he was delivered into the hands of the chaplain, who, accompanied by fifty armed men, conveyed him to a chamber, where the chains were taken from his legs and bound about his arms; and in this condition he was conducted to a place named the Old Tower, where he awaited the coming of the procession. After some little time had elapsed, the procession set out from the cathedral; two of the canons bore the shrine in which the relics of St. Romain were presumed to be preserved. When they had arrived at the Old Tower, the shrine was placed in the chapel, opposite to the criminal, who appeared kneeling, with the chains on his arms. Then one of the canons, having made him repeat the confession, said the prayers usual at the time of giving absolution; after which service, the prisoner kneeling still, lifted up the shrine three times, amid the acclamations of the people assembled to behold the ceremony. The procession then returned to the cathedral, followed by the criminal, wearing a chaplet of flowers on his head, and carrying the shrine of the saint. After mass had been performed, he had a very serious exhortation addressed to him by a monk; and, lastly, he was conducted to an apartment near the cathedral, and was supplied with refreshments and a bed for that night. In the morning he was dismissed.

This privilege was justified by the legend of the Gargouille, a fearsome dragon, and how St. Romain defeated him with the help of a prisoner. It was abolished in a famous night of the French Revolution.
