= Romanus of Rouen =

7th-century Frankish bishop and saint

Saint Romanus of Rouen
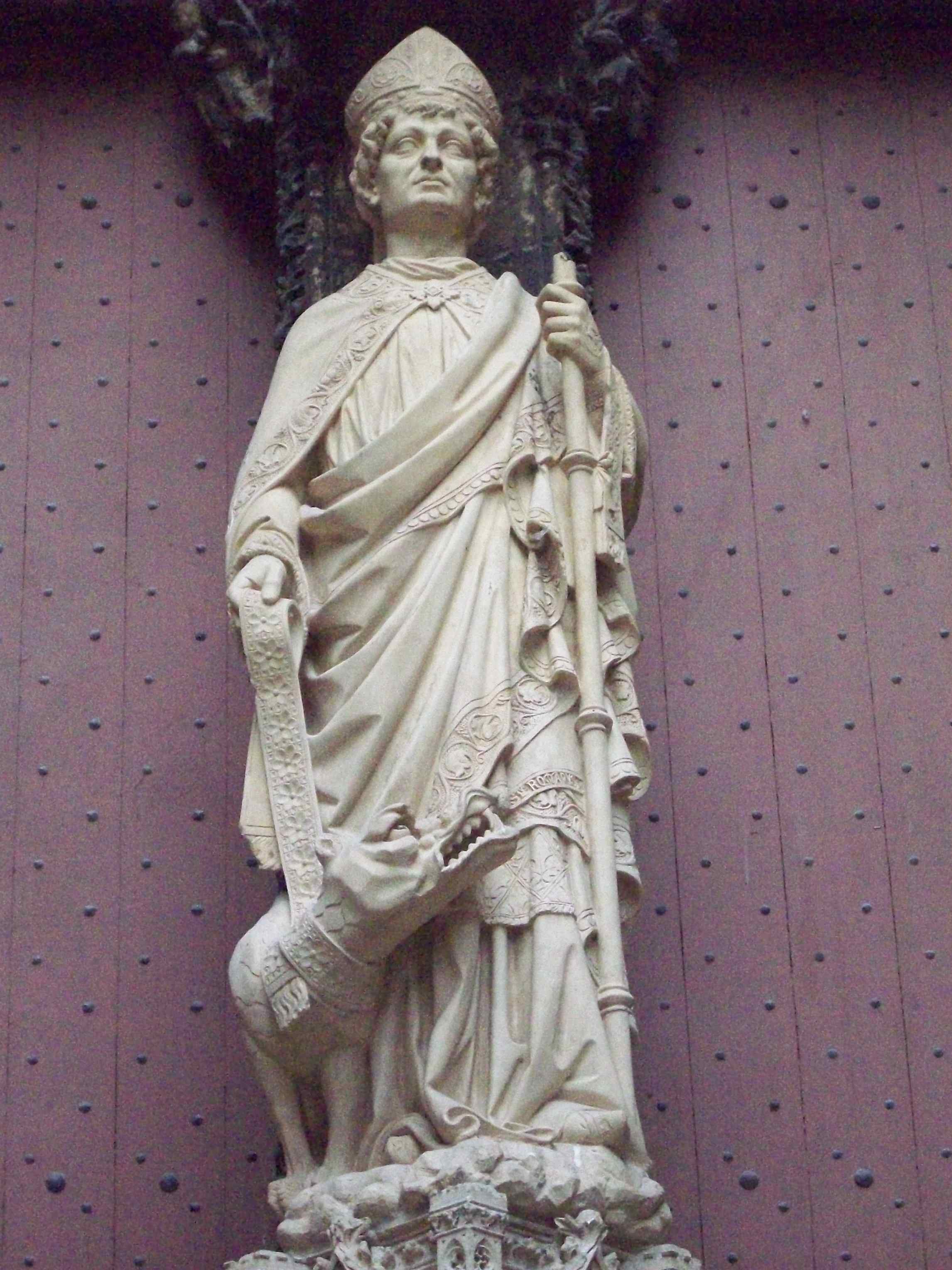
- Status of Romanus resting on a column in the doorway of the Rouen cathedral library.

Bishop
- Born: Unknown
- Died: c. 640; Kingdom of the Franks
- Venerated in: Eastern Orthodox Church; Roman Catholic Church
- Canonized: Pre-Congregation
- Major shrine: Rouen
- Feast: October 23
- Attributes: depicted with a Gargouille
- Patronage: Archdiocese of Rouen, City of Rouen

Saint Romanus of Rouen (French: Romain; reconstructed Frankish: *Hruomann; died c. 640 AD) was a scribe, clerical sage, and bishop of Rouen. He would have lived under Dagobert I (629–39), though his date of birth is unknown. His life is known in legend and tradition and is shown in the stained glass windows (c. 1521) and south gate of Rouen Cathedral and the stained glass windows of the église Saint-Godard (1555). The Catholic Encyclopedia claims that his legend has little historical value with little authentic information. He was both Lord Chancellor of France and Référendaire of France. (For Saint Romanus, Martyr, please see Romanus of Caesarea).

The city's autumn "foire Saint-Romain" was set to his feast day on the "10th day of the Kalends of November" (i.e. 23 October) around 1090, at the same date as his cult was spread to the whole diocese of Rouen.

== Life ==
=== Birth and youth ===
His mother Félicité lamented her sterility until one night an angel appeared to Romain's father announcing that a child would be born in his house. Very young, Romanus was sent to the king's court. This was common for young aristocrats of the time - those who went were known as nourris, meaning that they effectively carried out domestic duties to the court in return for some education, before being sent back to the provinces as bishops or counts. There Romanus met saints Eligius and Audoin. When the episcopal seat of Rouen became vacant, the college of canons voted for Romanus and the king consented to their choice, offering Romain a cross.

=== Legendary miracles ===
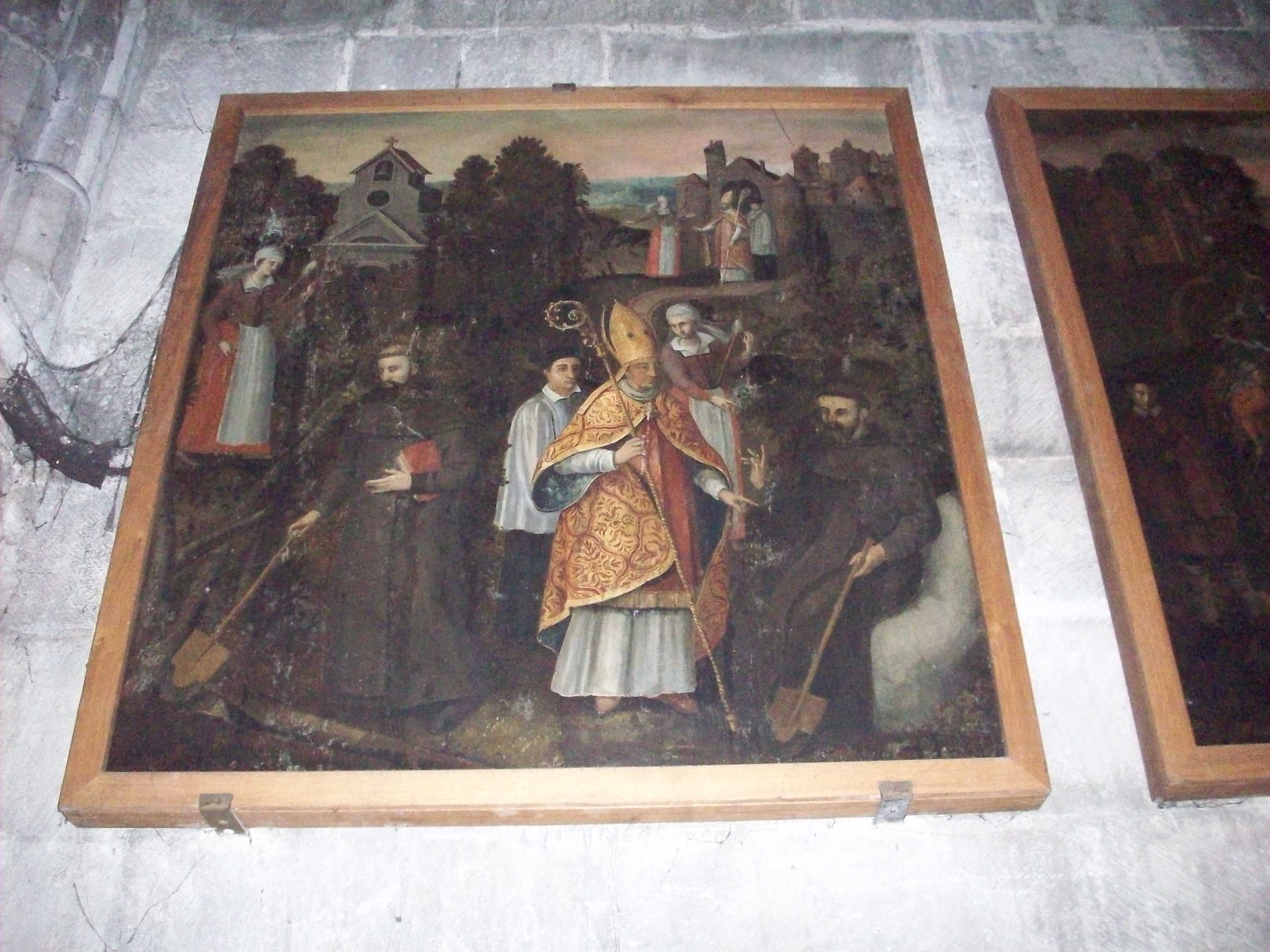
An image from the life of St. Romanus.

- Destruction of the Temple of Venus: Before becoming bishop, the faithful asked Romanus to make a temple to Venus (with an altar dedicated to her) in the Gallo-Roman amphitheatre in the north of the city disappear. Romanus went to the temple, pulled the dedication off the altar and the temple collapsed.
- Destruction of the pagan temple: Romanus set out to evangelise the surrounding countryside and one day found himself faced with a pagan temple that looked like a fortress, on which demons were dancing. He cursed the demons, provoked the chief demon and the temple collapsed.
- Miracle of the holy chrism: One day, Romanus was preparing to consecrate some baptismal fonts but found he had forgotten the holy chrism. The deacon he sent to look for it was in such a rush to return that he dropped and broke the vase containing the chrism, which leaked out onto the earth. Praying all the while, Romanus gathered up the pieces of the vase, which then put itself and its contents back together.
- Temptation: At the end of his life, he retired to a hermitage to pray and meditate. A demon disguised as a poor woman came to ask his charity and Romanus, though he hesitated to receive a woman, did not wish to renege on his duties of hospitality. He let in the woman who undressed and untressed her hair. Romanus called on the Lord for help and an angel intervened, throwing the demon into a bottomless pit.
- Floods: Flooding was frequent at this time, and Romanus intervened when it threatened to be catastrophic, making the river fall.
- Ecstasy: Shortly before his death, Romanus was saying the Mass when he entered an ecstasy, his body rising off the ground as God announced the date of his death.
- The dragon or Gargouille: the Gargouille (also Garguiem, as gargoyle from a word for "throat") is a dragon from the legend of Saint Romanus of Rouen. The monster does not figure in the older account of the saint's life, being recorded for the first time in 1394. The account described how, in the wild swamps on the left bank of the Seine a huge serpent or dragon rampaged, who "devoured and destroyed people and beasts of the field". Romanus decided to hunt in this area but could only find one man to help him, a man condemned to death who had nothing to lose. They arrived in the serpent's land and Romanus drew the sign of the cross on the beast. It then lay down at his feet and let Romanus put his stole on him as a leash, in which manner he led it into the town to be condemned to death and burned on the parvis of the cathedral (or thrown into the Seine according to other authors). This legend was the origin for the bishops' privilege (lasting until 1790) to pardon one prisoner condemned to death each year, by giving the pardoned man or woman the reliquary holding Romanus's relics in a procession.

== Festival ==
His feast day is traditionally celebrated in the archdiocese of Rouen on 23 October, as a Triple Feast - First Class. Today they are often transferred to the following Sunday, in contravention of the date decreed for the feast by archbishop Guillaume Bonne-Ame in around 1090.

== Hagiography ==
Four Lives of Saint Romain exist - one is a Latin verse version of the 8th century, another is a prose life addressed to the archbishop of Rouen by the doyen of Saint-Médard de Soissons. Those two lives are held in the Bibliothèque municipale de Rouen, whilst another Life is held by the Bibliothèque nationale de France in Paris.

== See also ==
- Privilege of St Romain

== Sources ==
- Jean-Patrick Beaufreton, La Seine Normande, Éditions Alan Sutton, 2001
- Alain Alexandre, Saint Romain, de la légende à la foire, collection histoire(s) d'agglo n°4, January 2001
