= Hugh of Amiens =

Picard-French Benedictine prelate

- archbishop of Rouen
- Diocese: Archdiocese of Rouen
- Term ended: 1164
- Predecessor: Geoffrey Brito
- Successor: Rotrou
- Other posts: Abbot of Reading, prior of Lewes, prior of Limoges

Orders
- Consecration: 1130

Personal details
- Died: 11 November 1164
- Buried: Rouen Cathedral
- Denomination: Catholic

Hugh of Amiens (died 1164), also known as Hugh de Boves, monk of Cluny, prior of Limoges, prior of Lewes, abbot of Reading and archbishop of Rouen, was a 12th-century Picard-French Benedictine prelate.

== Early career ==
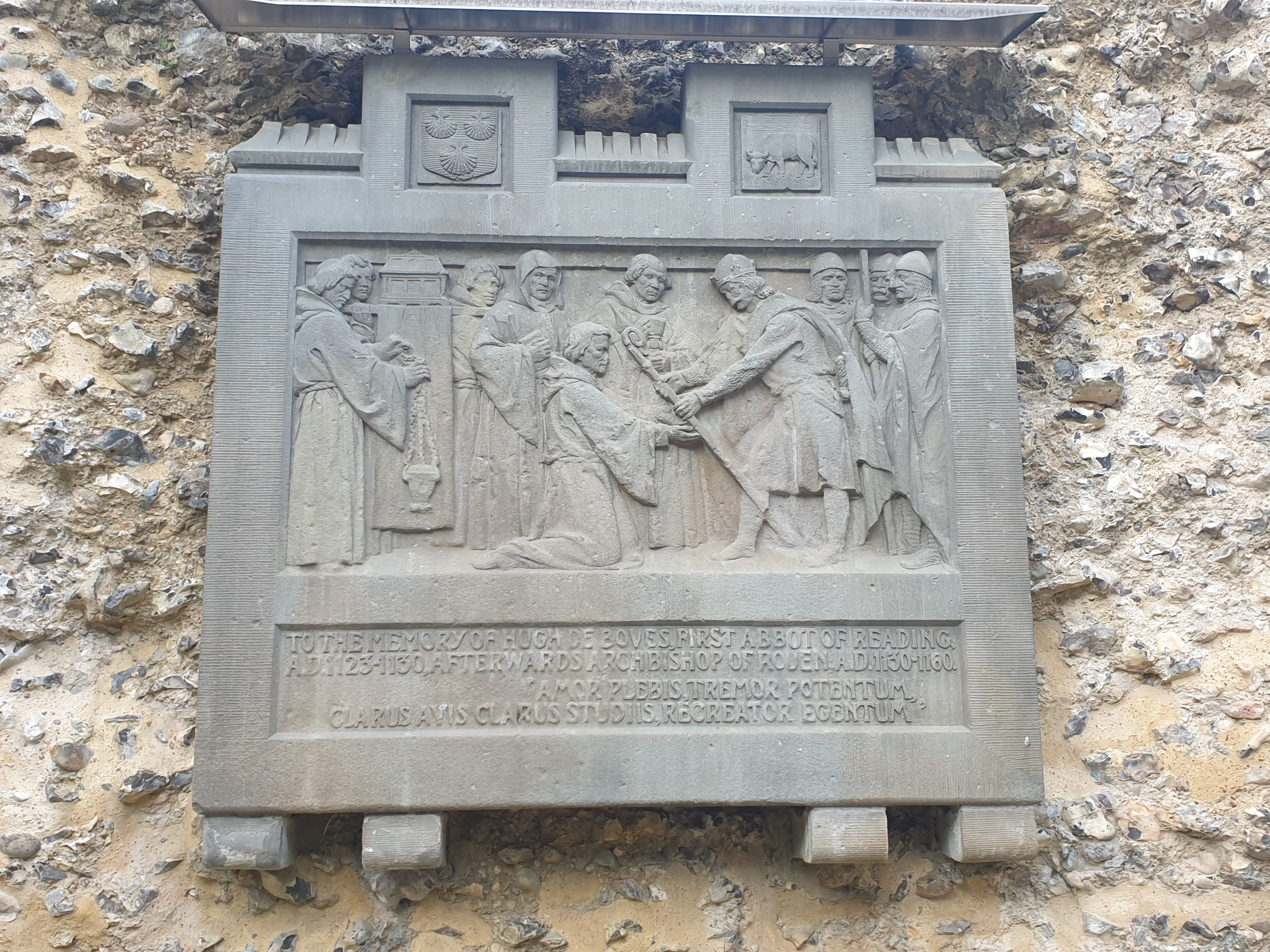
Bas-relief commemorating Hugh's role as first abbot of Reading Abbey, in the runined Chapter House of that abbey

Hugh was born in Laon late in the eleventh century. He belonged in all probability to the noble family of Boves, a theory to which his arms (an ox passant) give support. He was educated at Laon in the celebrated school of Anselm and Ralph, and became a monk of Cluny. A few years after his reception the abbot made him prior of Limoges, but he went to England about the same time, and became for a short time prior of Lewes, whence he was transferred in 1125 to the abbey of Reading. As Reading Abbey was a new foundation, Hugh was its first ever abbot.

While travelling abroad in 1129 he was elected to the archbishopric of Rouen and consecrated 14 September 1130. At this time he founded the St Martin d'Auchy abbey in Aumale. In his province he was vigorous and strict, and tried for some time in vain to bring the powerful abbots under his control. He took part with Pope Innocent II against Anacletus, received Innocent at Rouen in 1131, and rejoined him at the council of Rheims in the same year, bringing him letters in which the king of England recognised him as lawful pope.

Henry I had taken the side of the abbots in their recent struggle with Hugh, and he was now further incensed by Hugh's refusal to consecrate Richard, natural son of the Earl of Gloucester, bishop of Bayeux on account of his illegitimate birth. This difficulty was overcome through a special dispensation from the pope, but Hugh thought it prudent to go in 1134 to the Council of Pisa, and on its conclusion to remain in Italy on legatine business for some time.

He was recalled, however, by the murmuring of the nobles of his province and the personal complaints of Henry, and returned in 1135 in time, according to a letter preserved in the Historia Novella of William of Malmesbury, to attend the king, who had always respected him, on his deathbed at Colombières. In 1136 he was back at Rouen.

== Later career ==
Hugh was a staunch supporter of King Stephen, and passed much time in England during the civil wars. Early in 1137 Stephen went to Normandy, and when he had failed to capture Matilda's illegitimate half-brother, Robert, Earl of Gloucester, Hugh was one of his sureties that he would do Robert no further injury. It was by his intervention that the dispute between the king and the bishops regarding the custody of castles was settled at the council of Oxford in 1139, which Henry of Blois had summoned. Hugh also reconciled the Earl of Gloucester and the Count of Boulogne.

As the rebellious abbots of his province were now without royal support, he was able to carry out the decision of the council of Rheims, and to exact an oath of obedience; among those whom he forced to tender it was Theobald, afterwards archbishop of Canterbury, then newly elected abbot of Bec. In 1147 Hugh took part in the controversy with Gilbert de la Porrée. In 1150 Henry, eldest son of Henry II, began to rule in Normandy, and Hugh found in him a strong supporter. He died 11 November 1164, and was buried in the cathedral at Rouen, where there is an epitaph composed by Arnulf of Lisieux.

== See also ==
- Lawrence of Durham, another Benedictine dialogue writer of the time

== Bibliography ==
Writings by Hugh:

1. Dialogi de Summo Bono, seven books of dialogues, six of which were composed when he was at Reading, and revised, with the addition of a seventh, at Rouen.
2. De Heresibus sui Temporis, three books upon the church and its ministers, directed against certain heresies in Brittany. It was dedicated to Cardinal Alberic.
3. In Laudem Memoriæ and De Fide Catholica et Oratione Dominica.
4. De Creatione Rerum, or the Hexameron. The manuscript of this work passed to Clairvaux and thence to the library at Troyes (f. 423).
5. Vita Sancti Adjutoris, the life of a monk of Tiron. All these have been printed in Migne's Patrologiæ Cursus, Latin ser. vol. cxcii., where mention will be found of the previous editions of Martène and d'Achery. Some of Hugh's letters are to be found in Migne, and some in William of Malmesbury's Chronicle. Two were formerly in the library of Christ Church, Canterbury.

About Hugh:

- Knowles, David; Brooke, C. N. L.; London, C. M, eds. (2001), The Heads of Religious Houses : England and Wales. 1, 940–1216 (2nd ed.), Cambridge: Cambridge University Press, ISBN 0-521-80452-3

== Notes ==
Catholic Church titles
Preceded by New creation	Abbot of Reading; 1123–1130	Succeeded by Ansger
Preceded by Geoffrey Brito	Archbishop of Rouen; 1129–1164	Succeeded by Rotrou
