= St Mellons Church =

Church in Cardiff, Wales

- St Mellons Parish Church
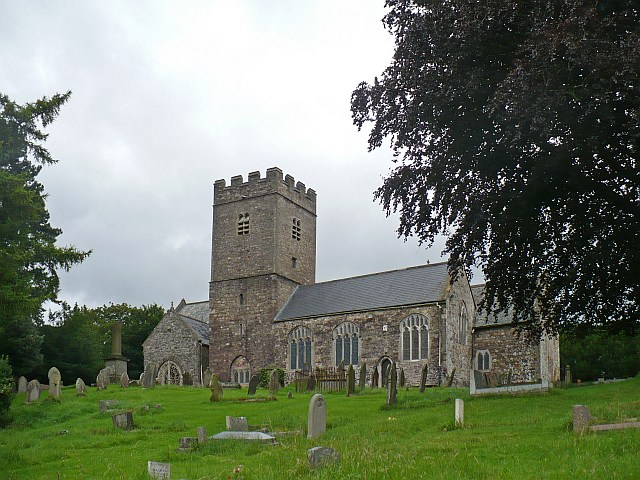
- St Mellons Church
- 51°31′34″N 3°06′49″W
- Denomination: Church in Wales
- Previous denomination: Roman Catholic; Church of England

History
- Status: active
- Dedication: St Mellonius

Architecture
- Heritage designation: Grade I
- Designated: 1963
- Years built: 13th century

Administration
- Diocese: Diocese of Monmouth
- Parish: Old St Mellons

St Mellons Parish Church, also previously called St Melan's church, is a Church in Wales parish church in the Diocese of Monmouth in Old St Mellons, Cardiff, Wales. It was built around the 13th century and is a Grade I listed building.

== History ==
It is not known when the church was first constructed however it first appears in historical records in 1254. It has been theorised that during their conquest of Wales, the Normans constructed it as their new church and dedicated it to St Mellonius, the early 4th-century Bishop of Rouen who was purported to have been born in the same area of Wales.

Though the church had been standing since the 13th century, none of the original materials makes up substantial parts of the church as it currently stands. The only parts of the church that remain from its original construction are the base of a high cross in the churchyard and the base of the Baptismal font which was made from parts of a Norman pier. It is implied that the church was reconstructed in the 14th century in view of the architecture of the tower and the design of the stained glass windows.

In the 19th century, the church underwent a series of restorations respecting its medieval designs. The renovations of 1858–9 to the main body of the church by George Gilbert Scott were sponsored by Edward Augustus Freeman of Llanrumney Hall. Further work of circa 1869 was by Charles Buckeridge. The chancel was restored in 1875 by Ewan Christian with the tower following in 1910.

== Listing ==
St Mellons Parish Church was granted Grade I listed status in 1963 owing to it retaining the majority of its medieval fabric. The base of the cross in the churchyard was granted Grade II status in 1977 to group it with the rest of the monuments on the church site as a "vestigial medieval churchyard cross for group value with the church and other listed items in St Mellons churchyard".
