= Guillaume de Rots =

Abbot of Fécamp Abbey, Normandy (d. 1107)

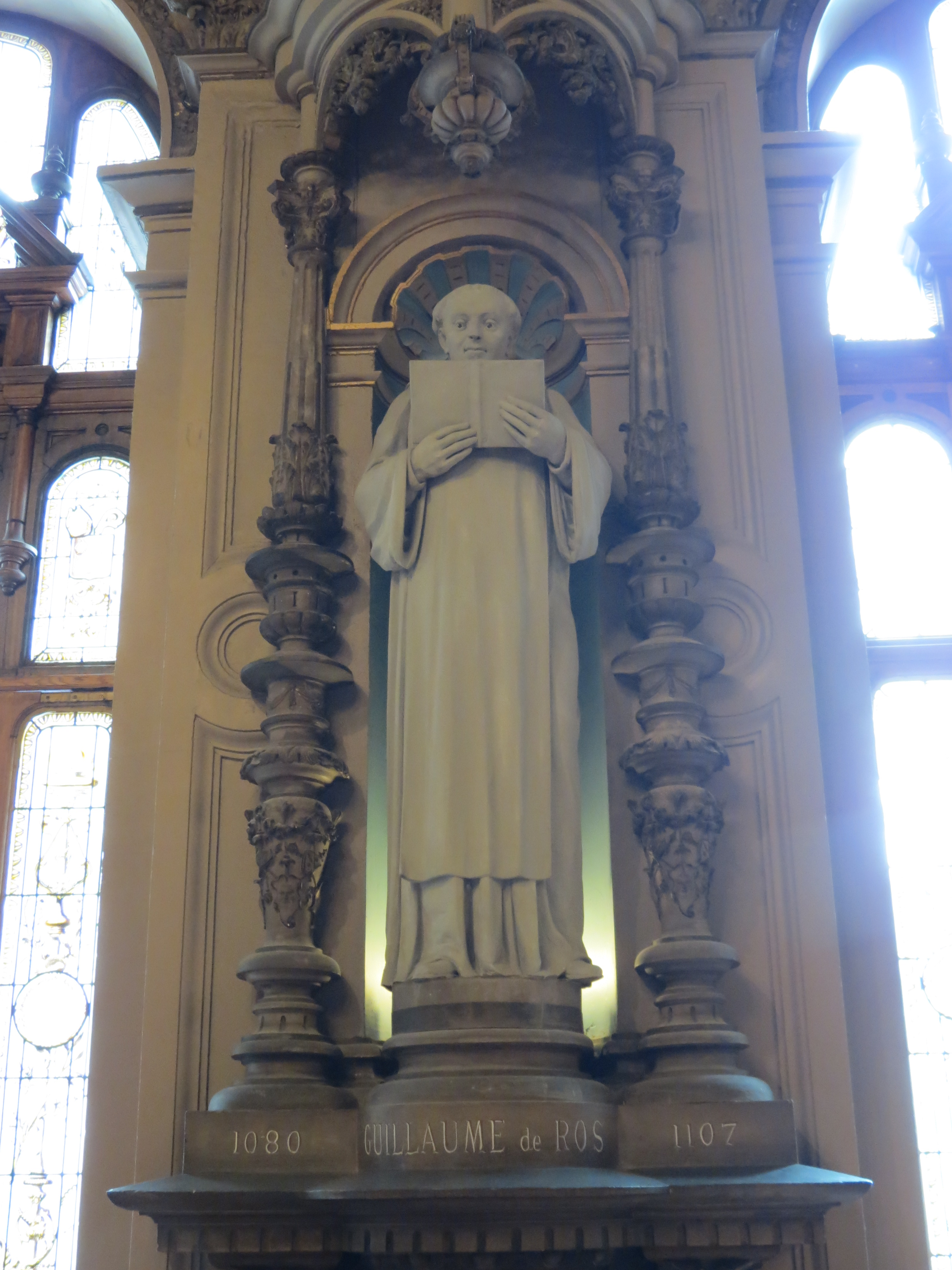
Statue of William de Rots

William of Rots, also William de Rots or Guillaume de Rots (Latin: Willelmus), was the third abbot of Fécamp Abbey in northern France.

== Biography ==
Originally from Rots in Calvados, Normandy, he was supposedly related to two knights of Lanfranc and Odo of Bayeux in Kent. Successively canon, cantor, dean and archdeacon of Bayeux around 1068/1069, he became a monk of the abbey of Saint-Étienne, Caen, where he remained for a year until he succeeded John of Fécamp (also known as Jean d'Allie) as abbot of Fécamp Abbey, by appointment of William the Conqueror.

In 1080/1082 he witnessed the confirmation by William the Conqueror of the foundation of Troarn Abbey.

In 1085, he travelled to England and visited Rye in Sussex, a possession of Fécamp Abbey, where he initiated the construction of St Mary's Church.

In 1087 he attended the funeral of William the Conqueror.

Around 1100, he authorised construction works on the abbey's Romanesque church, where he enlarged the choir in width and length and developed the nave in order to accommodate pilgrims. The new church was consecrated in 1099 (or 1106) by the Archbishop of Rouen William Bona Anima (Guillaume Bonne-Âme). It was destroyed by fire in 1168.

Falling ill on his return from the Council of Lisieux in March 1107, he died on 26 March 1107, before the choir of the church was completed, and was buried in the central chapel dedicated to the Virgin Mary.
