= Geoffrey Brito =

Breton archbishop

- Rouen
- Term ended: 1128
- Predecessor: William I Bonne-Âme
- Successor: Hugh IV
- Other post: dean of Le Mans

Orders
- Consecration: 1111

Personal details
- Died: November 1128
- Denomination: Catholic

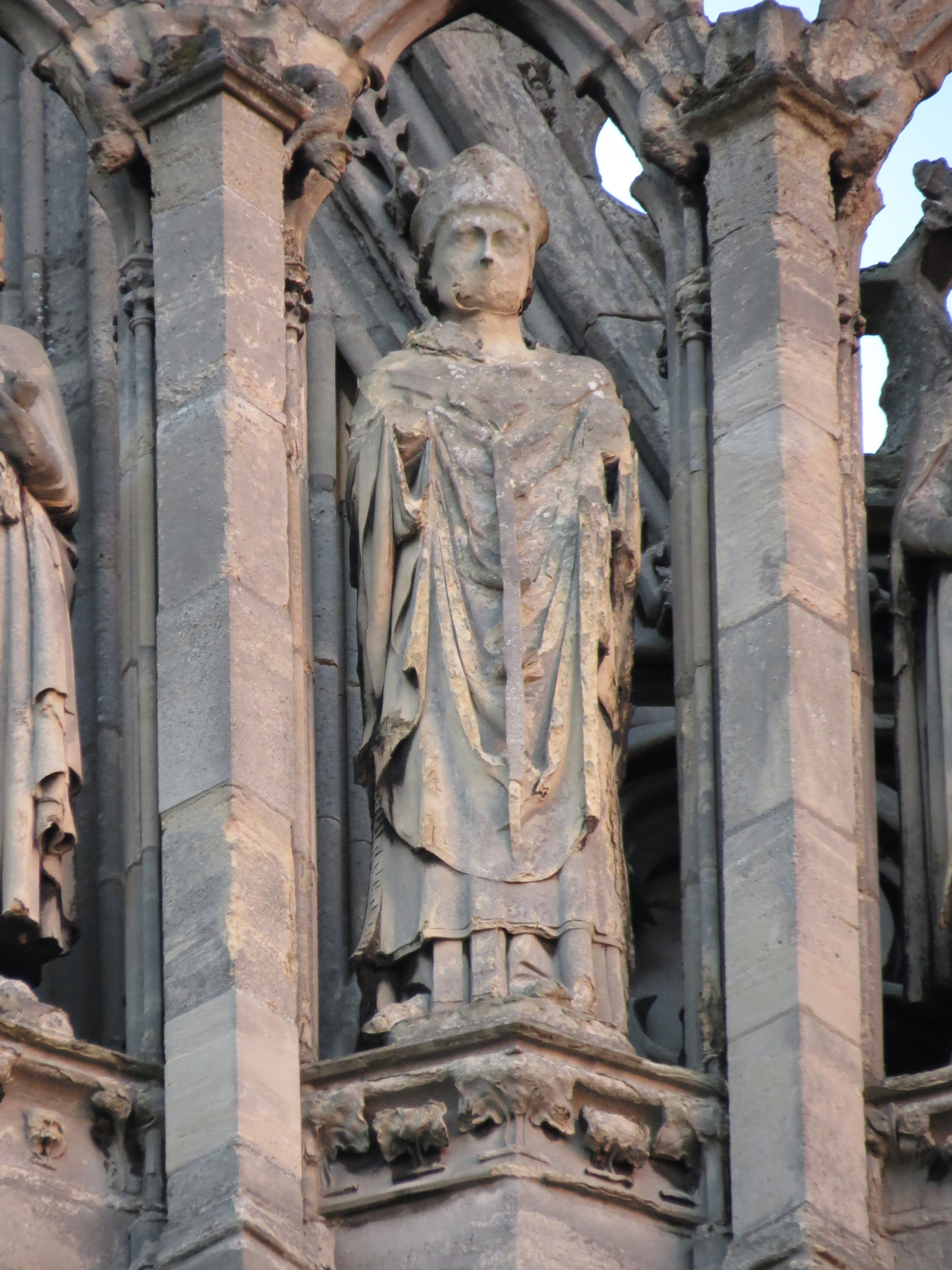
Statue of Geoffroy, Archbishop of Rouen, 3rd statue to the right of the gallery of the western facade.

Geoffrey Brito (or Geoffrey le Breton) (died 1128) was a native of Brittany who became Archbishop of Rouen in the Middle Ages. He served as archbishop from 1111 to 1128.

Brito was a native of Brittany and his family was noble. His brother Judicael was bishop of Saint-Malo. His first ecclesiastical appointment was as dean of Le Mans, around 1093. In 1096 Geoffrey was almost elected as bishop of Le Mans, but in the end Hildebert of Lavardin was elected. Geoffrey next appears in the public record when he was selected by King Henry I of England as archbishop in 1111. As archbishop, Geoffrey helped negotiate the marriage of Henry's daughter and heiress Matilda to Geoffrey of Anjou.

Brito died on either 26 or 28 November 1128.

== Sources ==
- Fisquet, Honoré (1864). La France pontificale (Gallia Christiana): histoire chronologique et biographique...Metropole de Rouen: Rouen (in French). Paris: Etienne Repos. pp. 82–85.
- Spear, David S. (1990). "Geoffrey Brito, Archbishop of Rouen (1111–1128)". In Patterson, Robert (ed.). Haskins Society Journal. Vol. 2. London: Hambledon Press. pp. 123–137. ISBN 1-85285-059-0.
