= Joseph-Marie Martin =

French Cardinal

His Eminence Joseph-Marie Martin
- Cardinal, Archbishop of Rouen
- Church: Roman Catholic
- Archdiocese: Rouen
- Installed: 11 October 1948
- Term ended: 6 May 1968
- Predecessor: Pierre Petit de Julleville
- Successor: André Pailler
- Other post: Cardinal-Priest of Santa Teresa al Corso d’Italia
- Previous post: Bishop of Le Puy-en-Velay (1940-1948)

Orders
- Ordination: 18 December 1920
- Consecration: 2 April 1940
- Created cardinal: 22 February 1965 by Paul VI
- Rank: Cardinal-Priest

Personal details
- Born: 9 August 1891 Orléans, France
- Died: 21 January 1976 (aged 84) Rouen, France
- Buried: Rouen Cathedral
- Motto: Cum Maria matre ejus
- Coat of arms

Styles of Joseph-Marie Martin
- Reference style: His Eminence
- Spoken style: Your Eminence
- Informal style: Cardinal
- See: Rouen (emeritus)

Joseph-Marie Martin (9 August 1891 – 21 January 1976) was a French Cardinal of the Roman Catholic Church. He served as Archbishop of Rouen from 1948 to 1971, and was elevated to the cardinalate in 1965.

== Biography ==
Joseph-Marie-Eugene Martin was born and baptised in Orléans. He later dropped the name "Eugene". He studied at the seminary in Bordeaux before serving in the French Army during World War I, during which he was seriously wounded. Martin was ordained to the priesthood on 18 December 1920, and then did pastoral work in the Archdiocese of Bordeaux until 1940. He was vicar general of Bordeaux from 1937 to 1940 as well.

On 9 February 1940, Martin was appointed Bishop of Le Puy-en-Velay by Pope Pius XII. He received his episcopal consecration on the following 2 April from Archbishop Maurice Feltin, with Bishops Clément Mathieu and Louis Liagre serving as co-consecrators, in the Cathedral of Bordeaux. Martin was later promoted to Archbishop of Rouen on 11 October 1948, and attended the Second Vatican Council from 1962 to 1965.

Pope Paul VI created him Cardinal Priest of S. Teresa al Corso d'Italia in the consistory of 22 February 1965. Cardinal Martin believed that the reaction of conservative Catholics to the introduction of the vernacular to the Mass could possibly result in a schism. He resigned as Archbishop on 29 May 1968, after nineteen years, and lost the right to participate in a papal conclave upon reaching the age of eighty on 9 August 1971.

Joseph-Marie Cardinal Martin died in Rouen, aged 84, and was interred in the metropolitan cathedral of Rouen. He had earlier survived several days buried in snow in the Pyrenees.

Catholic Church titles
Preceded by Norbert-Georges-Pierre Rousseau	Bishop of Le Puy-en-Velay; 1940–1948	Succeeded by Joseph-Marie-Jean-Baptiste Chappe
Preceded by Pierre-André-Charles Petit de Julleville	Archbishop of Rouen; 1948–1968	Succeeded by André Pailler
