= Flavius of Rouen =

6th-century French bishop

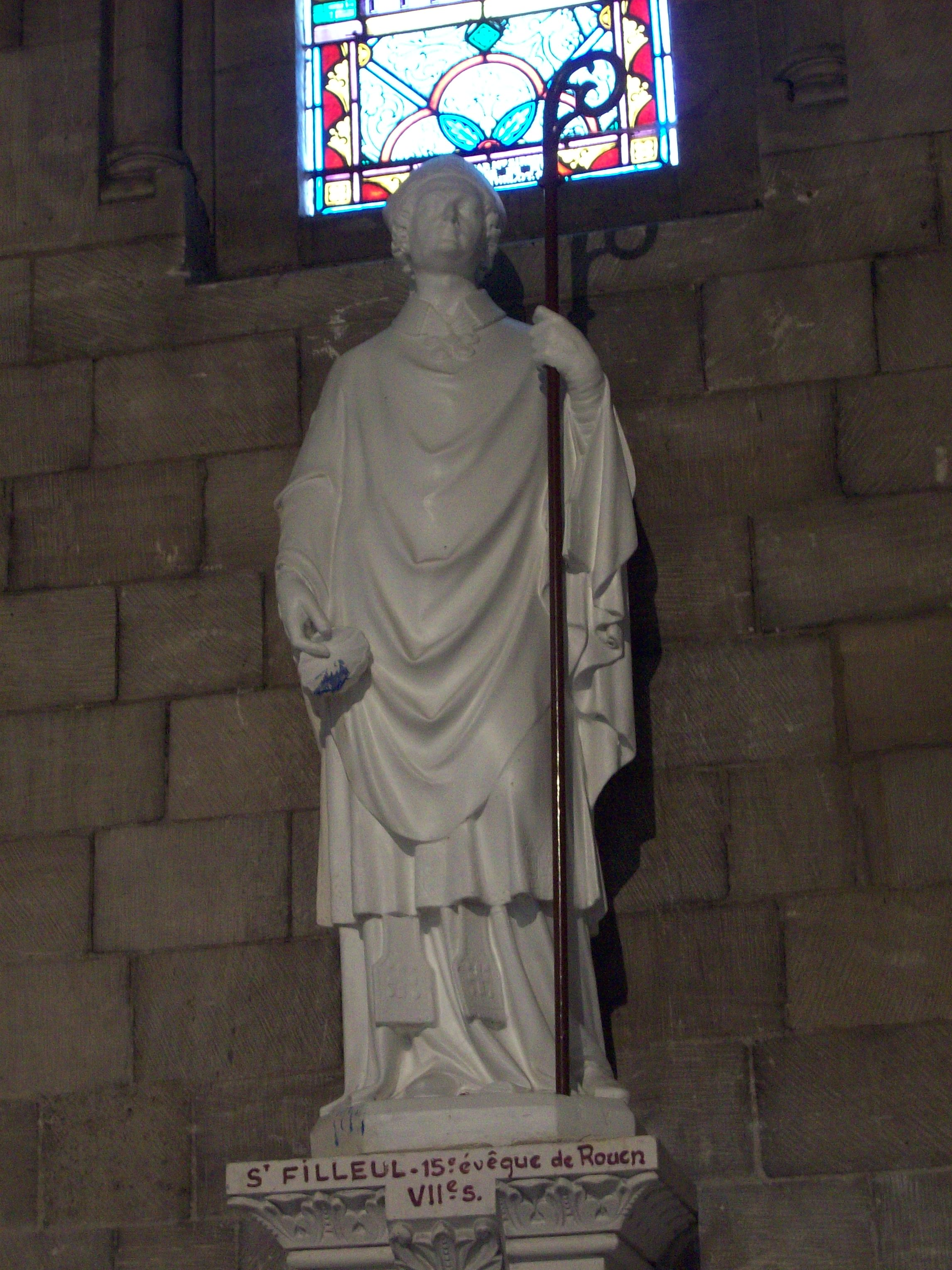
Statue of Saint Filleul in the Basilica of the Sacré Cœur, Rouen

Saint Flavius of Rouen, also known as Saint Filleul or Saint Flieu, was a 6th-century bishop of Rouen, the 16th in the usual sequence.

== Biography ==
Flavius was either of Roman origin or of a Gallic family who had knowledge of Rome.

He has sometimes been identified as governor of the palace of King Dagobert, but on chronological grounds this is clearly mistaken. He was more probably treasurer or superintendent of finances for either Childebert or Clotaire, the latter being the more likely. He became bishop of Rouen in 525, and attended the Second, Third, and Fourth councils of Orleans of 533, 538 and 541. It was during his episcopate, and, as is generally held, because of his efforts, that the Abbey of Saint Peter, otherwise of Saints Peter and Paul, later the Abbey of St. Ouen (French: Abbaye Saint-Pierre; Abbaye Saint-Pierre-Saint-Paul; Abbaye Saint-Ouen de Rouen), which was founded in 535. The quantity of 6th-century objects unearthed during 19th-century excavations seem to confirm the traditional foundation date. Flavius is also said to have changed the fountain of a pagan temple to a baptistry. According to an ancient chronicle of Jumièges, his body was buried in "St. Peter's Basilica", which seems more likely to mean the church of the abbey he founded than the basilica of that name in Rome.

His feast day is 23 August.

He was formerly commemorated in Rouen by a fountain in the Rue du Baptême in the suburb of Cauchoise.
