= Mousseaux-sur-Seine =

- Commune
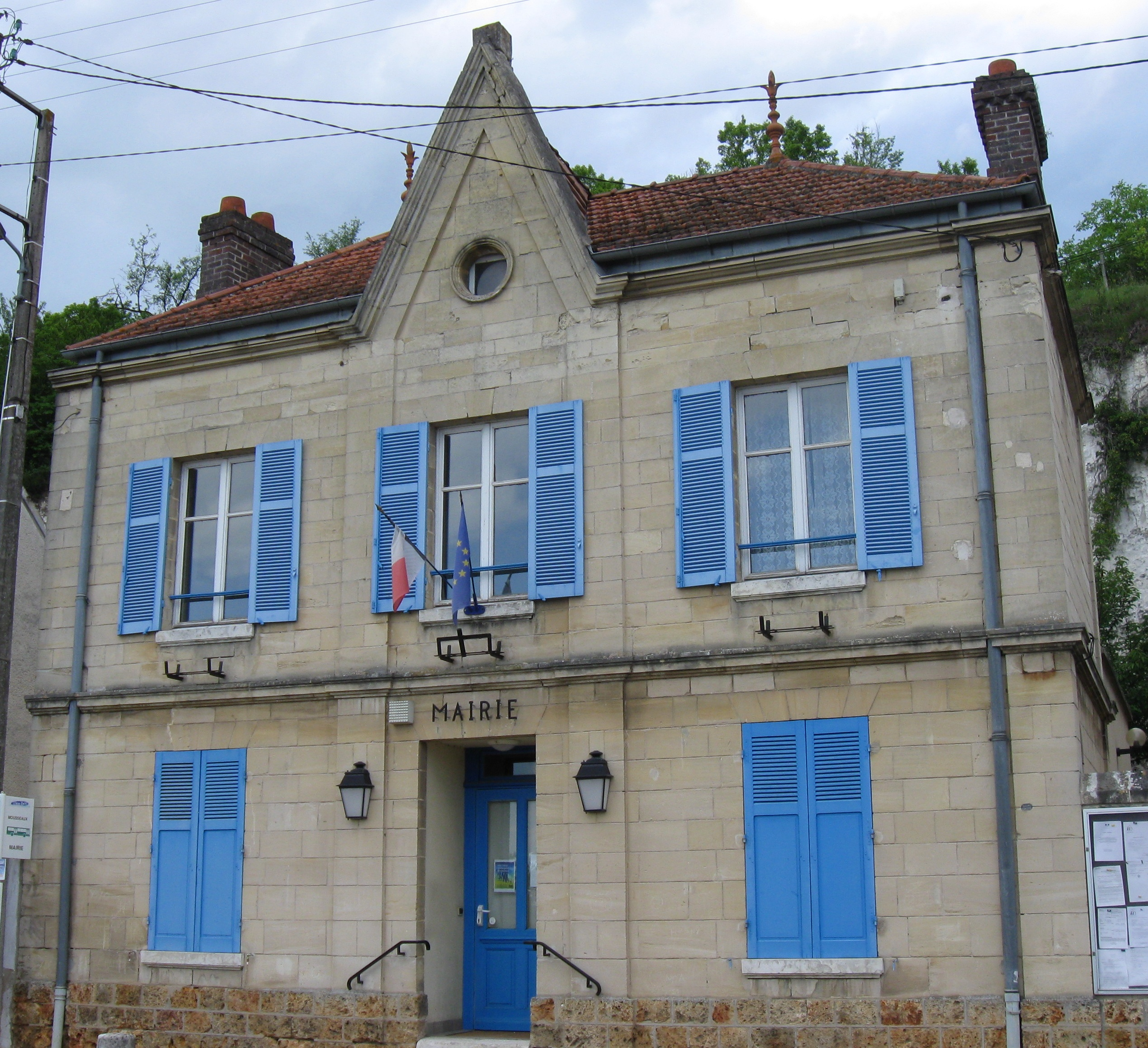
- The town hall in Mousseaux-sur-Seine
- Location of Mousseaux-sur-Seine
- Location within France Location within Île-de-France (region)
- Coordinates: 49°02′37″N 1°38′51″E
- Country: France
- Region: Île-de-France
- Department: Yvelines
- Arrondissement: Mantes-la-Jolie
- Canton: Bonnières-sur-Seine
- Intercommunality: CU Grand Paris Seine et Oise

Government
  - Mayor (2020–2026): Gérard Ours Prisbil
- Area^{1}: 7.20 km^{2} (2.78 sq mi)
- Elevation: 19 m (62 ft)
- Highest elevation: 68 m (223 ft)
- Lowest elevation: 12 m (39 ft)
- Population (2023): 689
  - Density: 95.7/km^{2} (248/sq mi)
- Time zone: UTC+01:00 (CET)
  - Summer (DST): UTC+02:00 (CEST)
- INSEE/Postal code: 78437 /78270
- ^{1} French Land Register data, which excludes lakes, ponds, glaciers > 1 km^{2} (0.386 sq mi or 247 acres) and river estuaries.

Mousseaux-sur-Seine (French pronunciation: [muso syʁ sɛn], literally Mousseaux on Seine) is a commune in the Yvelines department in the Île-de-France region in north-central France.

== Geography ==
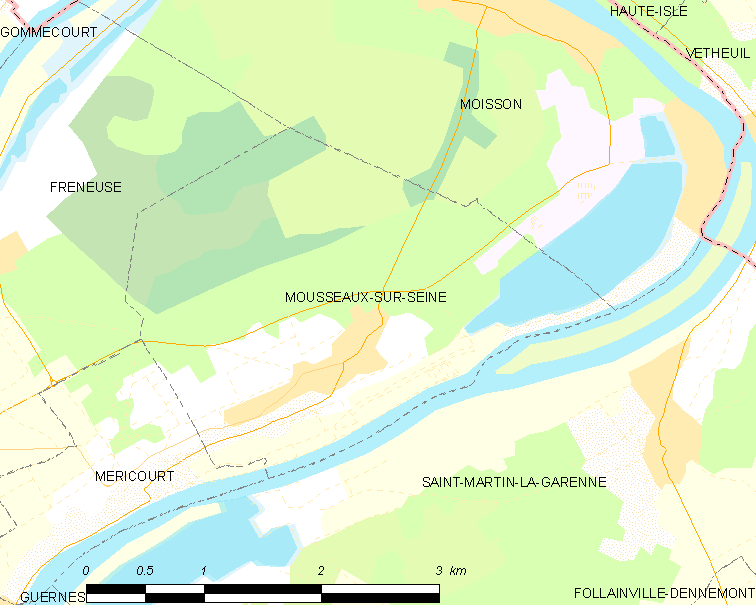
Map commune

Mousseaux-sur-Seine is a riverside town in the Seine, situated 14 km west of Mantes-la-Jolie and 6 km east of Bonnières-sur-Seine, on the Left Bank, in the loop Moisson. It borders of Freneuse Mericourt and west, north Moisson. To the east, it is separated by the Seine Saint-Martin-la-Garenne.

The village is located by the river along a limestone cliff where many were dug basements, "boves" which once served homes.

Seine borders the town to the southeast. Sablière of loops of the Seine Moisson-Mousseaux.

== History ==
This territory was already inhabited in the Neolithic period. Numerous flint weapons have been found. In pre-Roman Gaul the Belgic tribe of the Veliocasses or Velocasses controlled a large area around the town. Christianity came to the area with the work of Nicasius of Rouen, about 250AD

The village of Mousseaux is a center of caving in the area. The inhabitants of the area have nicknamed the caves "sparkling".

The village was until the late 18th century an important wine production, with remains, still visible, of an old press. In 2003, Mousseaux-sur-Seine chose to join the urban community of Mantes en Yvelines, rather than the community of communes des Portes Île-de-France focused on Bonnières-sur-Seine.

== Landmarks ==
- Saint-Léger church stone church Gothic Revival limestone dating from 1875.
- winepress: kept in a "bove" excavation dug into the limestone cliff.
- Painting workshop of Martine Darcel
- the Town Hall
- recreation Park on the river popular with Parisians
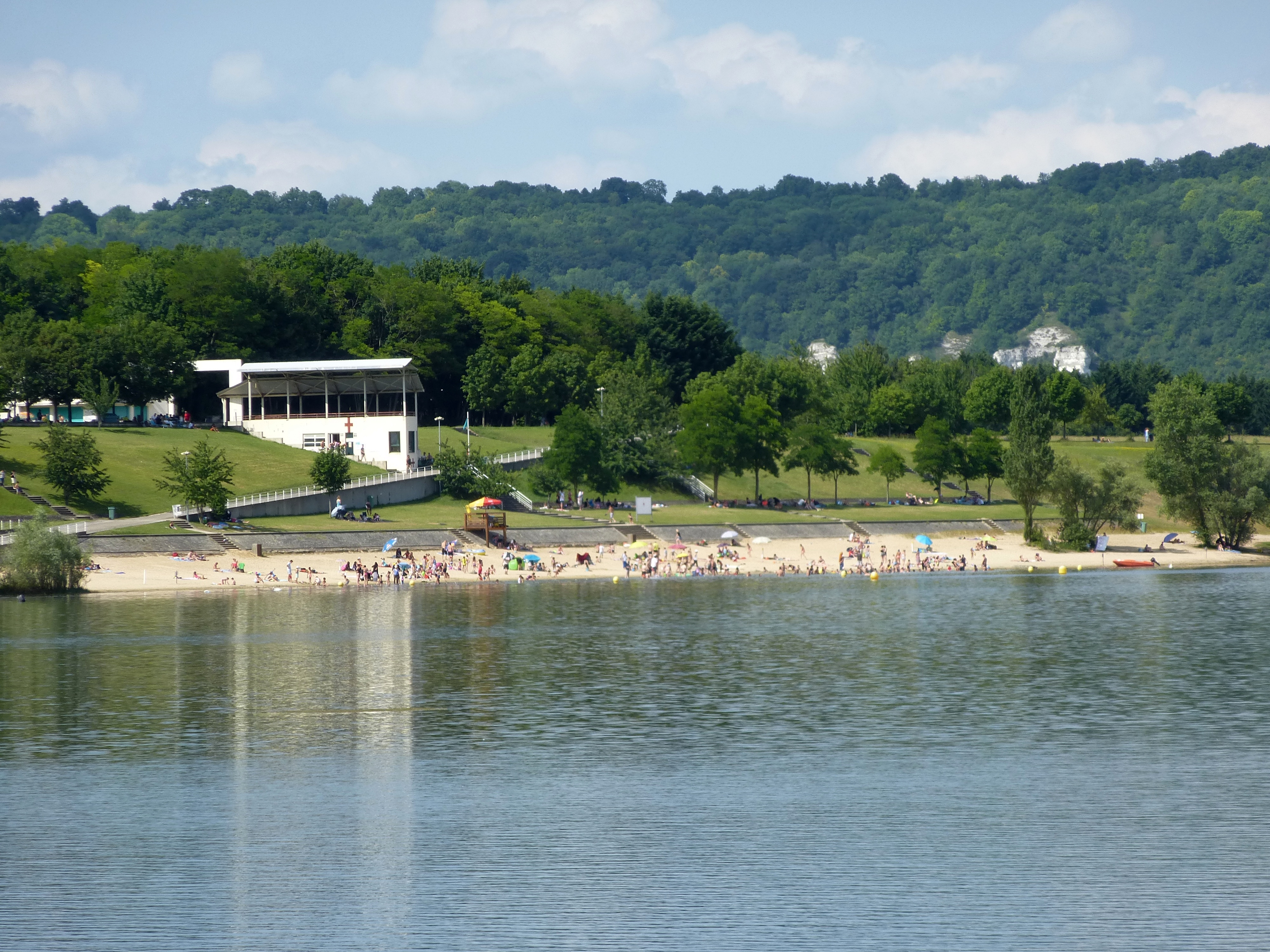
recreation Park

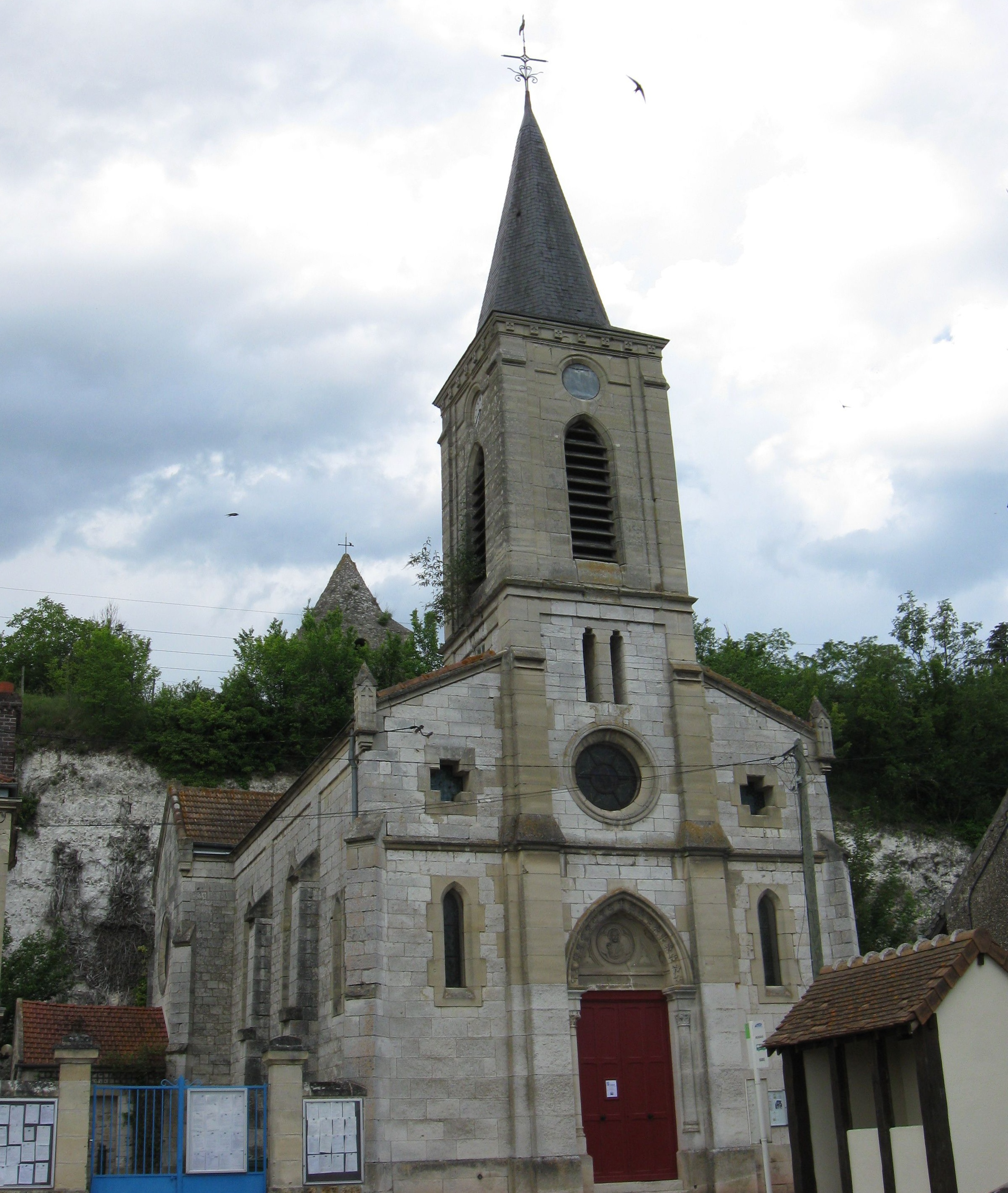
Town Catholic Church

== Population ==
The population of Mousseaux-sur-Seine went through a steady decline through the 19th century until 1900 when the population was about 170 and had reached 136 by the eve of World War II. After the war the population grew until today it has reached its pre-revolution numbers.

Historical population

Year	Pop.	±% p.a.
1793	631	—
1821	568	−0.37%
1846	407	−1.32%
1872	230	−2.17%
1901	168	−1.08%
1926	141	−0.70%
1946	185	+1.37%
1962	180	−0.17%
1968	191	+0.99%

Year	Pop.	±% p.a.
1975	289	+6.10%
1982	415	+5.31%
1990	494	+2.20%
1999	558	+1.36%
2007	610	+1.12%
2012	640	+0.96%
2017	682	+1.28%
2023	689	+0.17%

Source: EHESS and INSEE (1968–2023)

== See also ==
- Communes of the Yvelines department
