= Pierre Petit de Julleville =

French Catholic priest

His Eminence Pierre Petit de Julleville
- Cardinal, Archbishop of Rouen
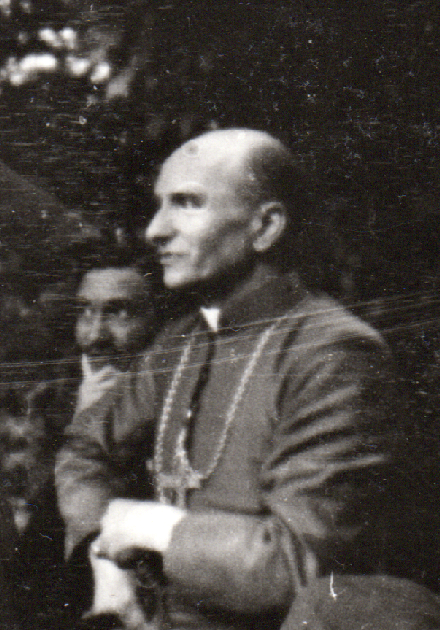
- Church: Roman Catholic
- Archdiocese: Rouen
- Installed: 7 August 1936
- Term ended: 10 December 1947
- Predecessor: André du Bois de La Villerabel
- Successor: Joseph-Marie Martin
- Other post: Cardinal-Priest of Santa Maria in Aquiro

Orders
- Ordination: 4 July 1903
- Consecration: 29 September 1927
- Created cardinal: 18 February 1946 by Pius XII
- Rank: Cardinal-Priest

Personal details
- Born: 22 November 1876 Dijon, France
- Died: 10 December 1947 (aged 71) Rouen, France
- Buried: Rouen Cathedral
- Denomination: Roman Catholic
- Motto: IN•PACE•ET•CARITATE•CHRISTI
- Coat of arms

Styles of Joseph-Marie Martin
- Reference style: His Eminence
- Spoken style: Your Eminence
- Informal style: Cardinal
- See: Rouen (emeritus)

Pierre Petit de Julleville (22 November 1876 – 10 December 1947) was a French Catholic priest, who became archbishop of Rouen. On 18 February 1946, Pope Pius XII elevated him into the College of Cardinals.

The baptismal name of Pierre Petit de Julleville was Pierre-André-Charles. He attended the seminary of Saint-Sulpice, and, the University of Sorbonne, both in Paris. Pierre Petit de Julleville was ordained on 4 July 1903 in Paris. After ordination, he continued the following two years additional theological studies. In 1905 he was named faculty member of the Grand Seminary of Issy Paris, where he taught from 1905 to 1910. He was canon of the cathedral chapter and superior of the School of Sainte-Croix-de-Neuilly, Neuilly, from 1910 to 1914, and, after the war from 1918 to 1927. During World War I, in all the war years 1914–1918, Pierre Petit de Julleville was military chaplain.

Pierre Petit de Julleville was elected bishop of Dijon on 23 June 1927. He was consecrated on 29 September 1927, in the metropolitan cathedral of Paris, by Cardinal Louis-Ernest Dubois, archbishop of Paris. He was promoted to the metropolitan see of Rouen on 7 August 1936, where he acted as Apostolic administrator of the see of Dijon from 18 September 1936 to 15 May 1937. Pope Pius XII created him cardinal priest on 18 February 1946. Pierre Petit de Julleville received the title of S. Maria in Aquiro on 22 February 1946. He died less than 2 years later, on 10 December 1947 in Rouen, and is buried in the metropolitan cathedral of Rouen.

== Bibliography ==
- Brain, Roger. Le Cardinal Petit de Julleville. Paris: Centre de documentation sacerdotale, 1948;
- Chapeau, O.S.B. André and Fernand Combaluzier, C.M. Épiscopologe français des temps modernes, 1592–1973. Paris : Letouzey et Ané, 1974, p. 443-444;
- De la Serre, René. Le Cardinal Petit de Julleville. Paris: Librairie Plon, 1955.
