= Nicasius of Rouen =

French Roman Catholic saint

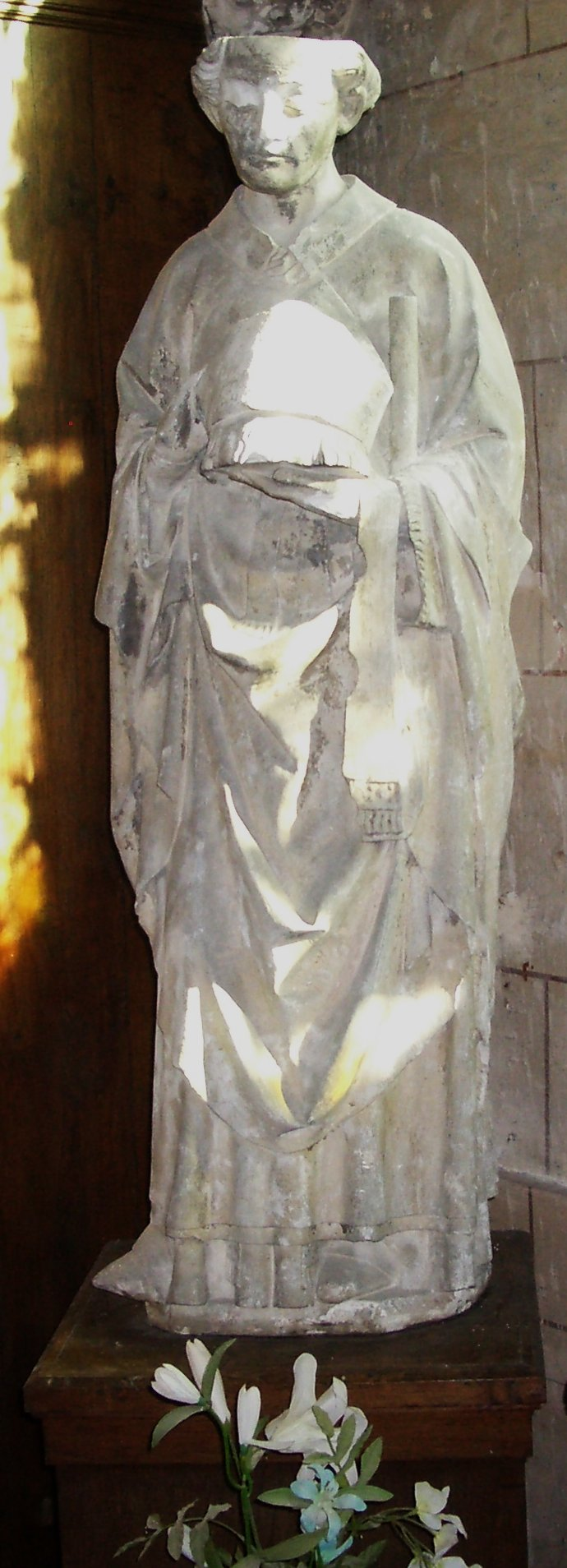
Statue of Saint Nicasius in the collegiate church of Écouis

Saint Nicasius of Rouen (French: Nicaise de Rouen; d. perhaps c. 260), often known as the Apostle of the Vexin, was a 3rd-century saint and martyr in Gaul. He is sometimes considered the first Bishop of Rouen.

== Life ==
While the Liber Eburneus of the cathedral of Rouen indicates St. Mellon as first Bishop of Rouen, the Liber Niger of St. Ouen and the episcopal lists dating from the twelfth century mention the episcopate of a certain Nicasius (Nicaise) as antedating that of St. Mellon.

According to tradition, Nicasius was an associate of Denis of Paris. Confusion of this Denis with Dionysius the Areopagite led some to suppose that Nicasius was born in Athens.

According to Hilduin of Saint-Denis, Nicasius evangelized the Vexin. He spent a year at Mousseaux and evangelized Rolleboise nearby. He performed several miracles and evangelized numerous places along the Seine (among them Conflans, Andrésy, Triel, Vaux, Meulan, Mantes and La Roche-Guyon). His companion, Quirinus, is said to have delivered the residents of Pontoise from a dragon.

Nicasius and his two companions were beheaded on the banks of the Epte in Gasny before reaching Rouen. He was believed to have been buried in Gasny. At the beginning of the ninth century the relics of Quirinus were translated to Malmedy Abbey.

Saint Mellon, possibly the next bishop, is traditionally said to be a disciple of Nicasius.

== Cultus ==
Nicasius is a saint, listed in the Roman Martyrology on 11 October, his feast day. He is represented in art as a cephalophore, referring to his martyrdom, and also as a bishop.

== See also ==
- Nicasius, Quirinus, Scubiculus, and Pientia
