= Ralph of Laon =

Ralph of Laon (died 1131/3), whose name may also be spelled Radulf or Radulph, was a master of the School of Laon and the brother of Anselm of Laon. He succeeded his brother as archdeacon in 1117. In his Metalogicon, John of Salisbury calls Ralph and Anselm "the brightest lights of Gaul". In the 1148 trial of Anselm's student Gilbert of Poitiers, one of the witnesses for the defence also presented Anselm and Ralph as "the most illustrious teachers" of their time in France.

Illustration of an abacus from St John's College MS 17 matching Ralph's description

Around 1100, Ralph wrote the Liber de Abaco, a book on arithmetic by means of the abacus. He cites as his predecessors Gerbert of Aurillac and Hermann of Reichenau. He uses a mixture of Roman numerals and Hindu–Arabic numerals, including the sipos (placeholder) symbol, but is unfamiliar with the concept of zero. He calls the markers on the abacus 'characters' (caracteres) and believes their common names (based on their values) to be of Chaldaean origin. He knows that abacus comes from Greek and means 'table'. He claims that, as a device for multiplication and division, it was invented by the ancient philosophers and is necessary for all the arts of the Quadrivium. It is also useful for understanding the world soul, which has a numerical structure.

Besides his work in mathematics, Ralph lectured and wrote extensively on the Bible. Peter Comestor implies that Ralph lectured on the gospels of Matthew, Luke and John. The Glossa Ordinaria on the Song of Songs are attributed to Ralph in some manuscripts and Anselm in others. Ralph's role in the compilation of the glosses is thus uncertain. He may have edited his brother's collection or turned a commentary by Anselm into a set of glosses. Although most of the glosses were taken from existing authorities, those which are original to the Glossa were presumably authored by Anselm or Ralph. Comestor implies that Ralph also compiled the Glossa on Matthew, an ascription that is credible.

Ralph also wrote a treatise on music, De semitono.

== Bibliography ==
- Ballentyne, Adrian (1989). "A Reassessment of the Exposition on the Gospel according to St Matthew in Manuscript Alençon 26". Recherches de théologie ancienne et médiévale. 56: 19–57. JSTOR 26188966.
- Caiazzo, Irene (2020). "Teaching the Quadrivium in the Twelfth-Century Schools". In Cédric Giraud (ed.). A Companion to Twelfth-Century Schools. Translated by Ignacio Duran. Brill. pp. 180–202.
- Dove, Mary, ed. (2004). The Glossa Ordinaria on the Song of Songs. Medieval Institute Publications.
- Ekman, Ellen Annika Margareta (2019). Anselm of Laon, the Glossa Ordinaria, and the Tangled Web of Twelfth-Century Psalms-Exegesis (PhD dissertation). University of Toronto.
- Evans, Gillian R. (1979). "Schools and Scholars: The Study of the Abacus in English Schools, c. 980–c. 1150". The English Historical Review. 94 (370): 71–89. JSTOR 567158.
- Peden, A. M. (1994). "De semitono: Some Medieval Exercises in Arithmetic". Studi medievali. 35: 367–403.
- Smalley, Beryl (1936). "Gilbertus Universalis, Bishop of London (1128–34), and the Problem of the «Glossa Ordinaria»". Recherches de théologie ancienne et médiévale. 8: 24–60. JSTOR 26182913.
- Smith, David Eugene; Karpinski, Louis Charles (1911). The Hindu-Arabic Numerals. Ginn.
