= Melaine =

6th-century Bishop of Rennes

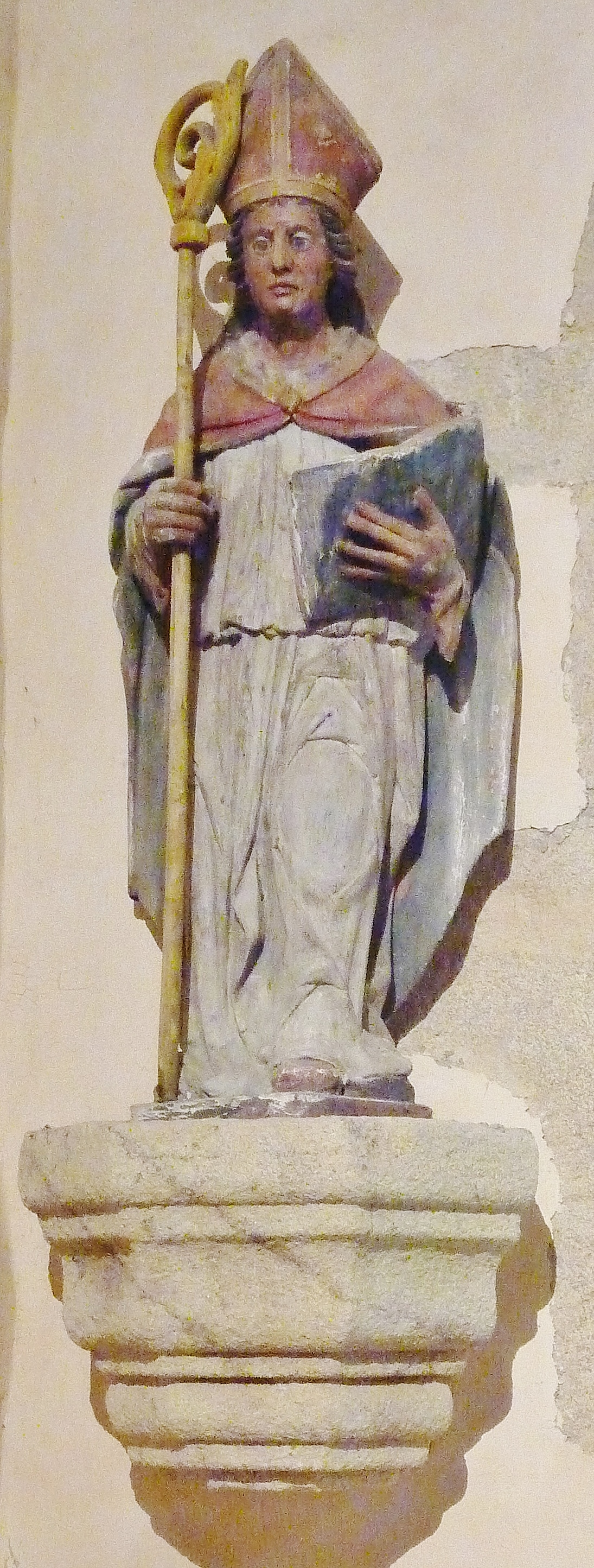
A statue of Melaine at the Chapelle Saint-Philibert et Saint-Roch de Moëlan-sur-Mer.

Saint Melaine (Latin: Melanius or Mellanus; Breton: Melani; Cornish: Melan; Welsh: Mellon) was a 6th-century Bishop of Rennes in Brittany (now in France).

== Traditional history ==
Melaine was born at near Redon in Plaz in Brain, to a Gallo-Roman family. He became a monk and then abbot of a small monastery he established near his home. He was nominated the successor to Bishop Amand of Rennes. Traditions recounted by Baring-Gould state that on the death of Amand, he was compelled by the local population to become the next Bishop, accepting the role with great reluctance; that he performed many miracles and put an end to heathen practices; and that following his death at La Vilaine, his body was placed on a boat which then returned to Rennes against the current without the assistance of rowers or sails. (However, Louis Duchesne is of opinion that the Amandus reckoned among the bishops of Rennes at the end of the fifth century is the same as Amand of Rodez. He therefore excludes him from his list of authentic bishops of Rennes.)

During his rule, Clovis took over the area and Melaine became his trusted advisor. He opposed immigration from Britain and attended the First Council of Orléans in 511. He died at Plaz in 530 and was buried in the Abbey Church of Notre-Dame en Saint-Mélaine in Rennes.

== Veneration ==
Melaine quickly became revered as a saint, especially after the wooden tower above his grave burnt down and his tomb miraculously survived. Saint Melaine is the principal patron saint of the Diocese of Rennes. The abbey church of Notre-Dame-en-Saint-Melaine in Rennes was dedicated to him.

His feast day is 6 November. In the 2004 edition of the Roman Martyrology, Melaine is listed under 6 November, with the Latin name Melánii. He is mentioned as follows: 'At Rhedónibus (Rennes) in Brittany, bishop, who passed to God in the place called Plácium on the River Vicenóniam (Vilaine), where with his own hands he built a church and gathered a congregation of monks and servants of God'.

In the English translation of the 1956 edition of the Roman Martyrology, he is listed under 6 January with the citation: At Rennes, in France, St Melanius, Bishop and Confessor, who displayed innumerable virtues, and with his thoughts ever fixed on heaven, passed from the world in glory. In the Diocese of Quimper his feast is celebrated on 6 January.

In Cornwall, he is the patron of the villages of St Mellion and Mullion, where there is a tradition of his visit.

In Wales, his feast is celebrated locally on 10 October rather than 11 October at St Mellons, in modern-day Cardiff, though there is ambiguity over whether Melaine is the Saint 'Mellonius' said to have been born there.
