= Mellonius =

4th-century Bishop of Rotomagus (Rouen)

Saint Mellonius
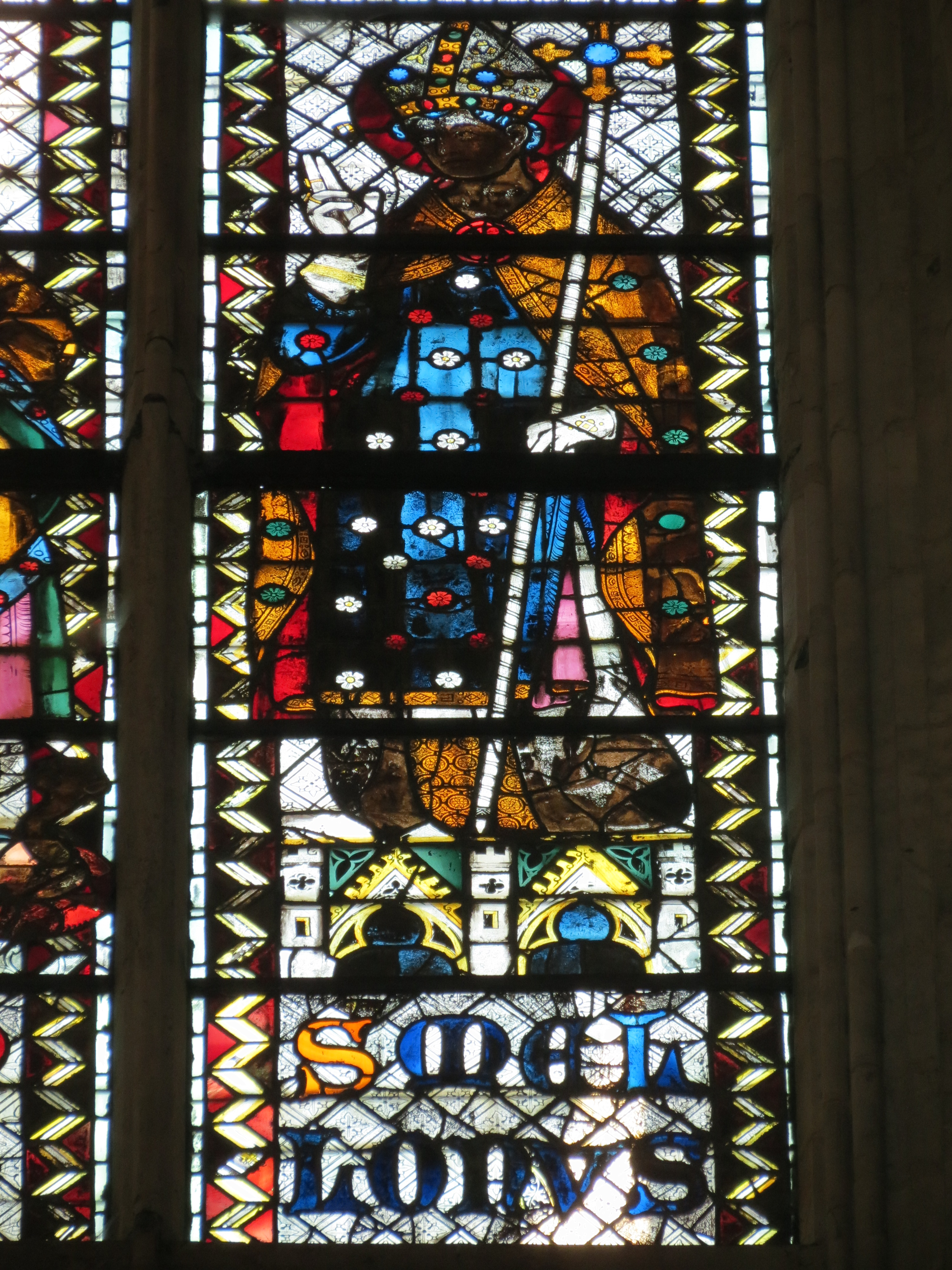
- Born: c. 229; Llanewrwg (St Mellons), Wales
- Died: 314; Hericourt, France
- Venerated in: Roman Catholic Church; Eastern Orthodox Church; Church in Wales
- Major shrine: Church of St Mellon in St Mellons, Cardiff, Wales
- Feast: 22 October

Saint Mellonius (229–314) was an early 4th-century Bishop of Rotomagus (now Rouen) in the Roman province of Secunda Provincia Lugdunensis (now Normandy in France). He is known only from a 17th-century 'Life' of little historical value, meaning the historicity of his existence is uncertain.

== Legend ==
Mellonius (surnamed Probus) is said to have been born near Cardiff in Wales, presumably at St Mellons, although the saint there is generally thought to be Saint Melaine, Bishop of Rennes. The two have, unfortunately, been hopelessly confused in many biographies. Mellonius' story tells how he travelled to Rome to pay the British tribute. He was there converted to Christianity by Pope Stephen I, who ordained him priest and later consecrated him a bishop.

Shortly after the martyrdom of Pope Stephen in 257, Mellonius set out for Gaul. He succeeded Nicasius of Rouen as Bishop of Rouen in 261. After a long episcopate, in 311, he retired to a hermit's cell at a place called Hericourt, where he died A.D. 314. Mellonius was succeeded by Avitianus.

He is sometimes confused with Mellonius, Bishop of Troyes, from 390 to 400.

== Veneration ==
His feast day is 22 October. In the English translation of the 1956 edition of the Roman Martyrology, 'St Mellon' is listed under 22 October with the citation: At Rouen, St Mellon, Bishop, who was ordained by Pope St Stephen and sent thither to preach the Gospel.

In the 2004 edition of the Roman Martyrology, Mellonius is listed under the same date, 22 October, with the Latin name Mallóni. He is mentioned as follows: 'At Rothómagi (Rouen), bishop, who in that city announced the Christian faith and handed on the episcopate'.

Bishop Mellonius is depicted in a fifteenth-century illuminated Book of Hours.

Mellonius was buried at Rouen, but his remains were subsequently translated to a church in Pontoise towards the end of the eighth century to protect them from Norse warbands. They remained there until they were lost during the French Revolution.

== Legacy ==
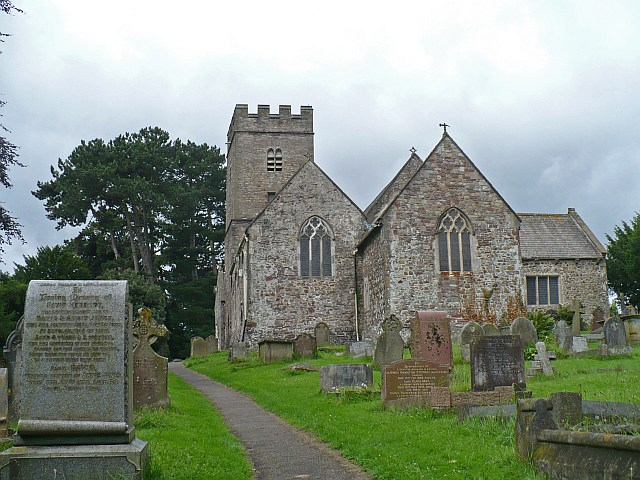
St. Mellon's Parish Church

St. Mellon's Church in St. Mellons, Cardiff is dedicated to Mellonius of Rouen. A fair used to be held on his feast day in the village of St Mellons. The church was previously dedicated to St. Lucius, but was changed upon the arrival of the Normans. The church at Thiédeville is dedicated to him at Héricourt, where there was a holy well. There is also a church dedicated to St. Mellon in Plomelin, Brittany.
