= William Bona Anima =

11th and 12th-century Archbishop of Rouen

- Archbishop of Rouen
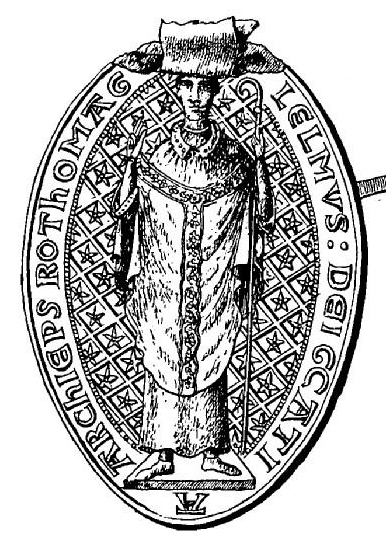
- Seal of Guillaume Bonne-Âme
- Installed: 1079
- Term ended: 1110
- Predecessor: John of Avranches
- Successor: Geoffrey Brito
- Other posts: abbot of Saint-Etienne, Caen

Personal details
- Died: 1110
- Denomination: Catholic

William Bona Anima or Bonne-Âme (died 1110) was a medieval archbishop of Rouen. He served from 1079 to 1110.

William was the son of Radbod Fleitel, the bishop of Sées and was a canon at Rouen as well as an archdeacon in that diocese. He then entered a monastery and became abbot of the monastery of Saint-Etienne in Caen from 1070 to 1079. He then was named archbishop of Rouen, where he served from 1079 to 1110.

== Sources ==
- Spear, David S. (1993). "The School of Caen Revisited". In Patterson, Robert B. (ed.). Haskins Society Journal: Studies in Medieval History. Vol. 4. Woodbridge, UK: Boydell. pp. 97–108. ISBN 0-85115-333-X.
