= Archdiocese of Rouen =

Archdiocese of the Roman Catholic Church in France

Coordinates: 49.4402°N 1.09509°E

Archdiocese of Rouen Archidioecesis Rothomagensis Archidiocèse de Rouen

Catholic
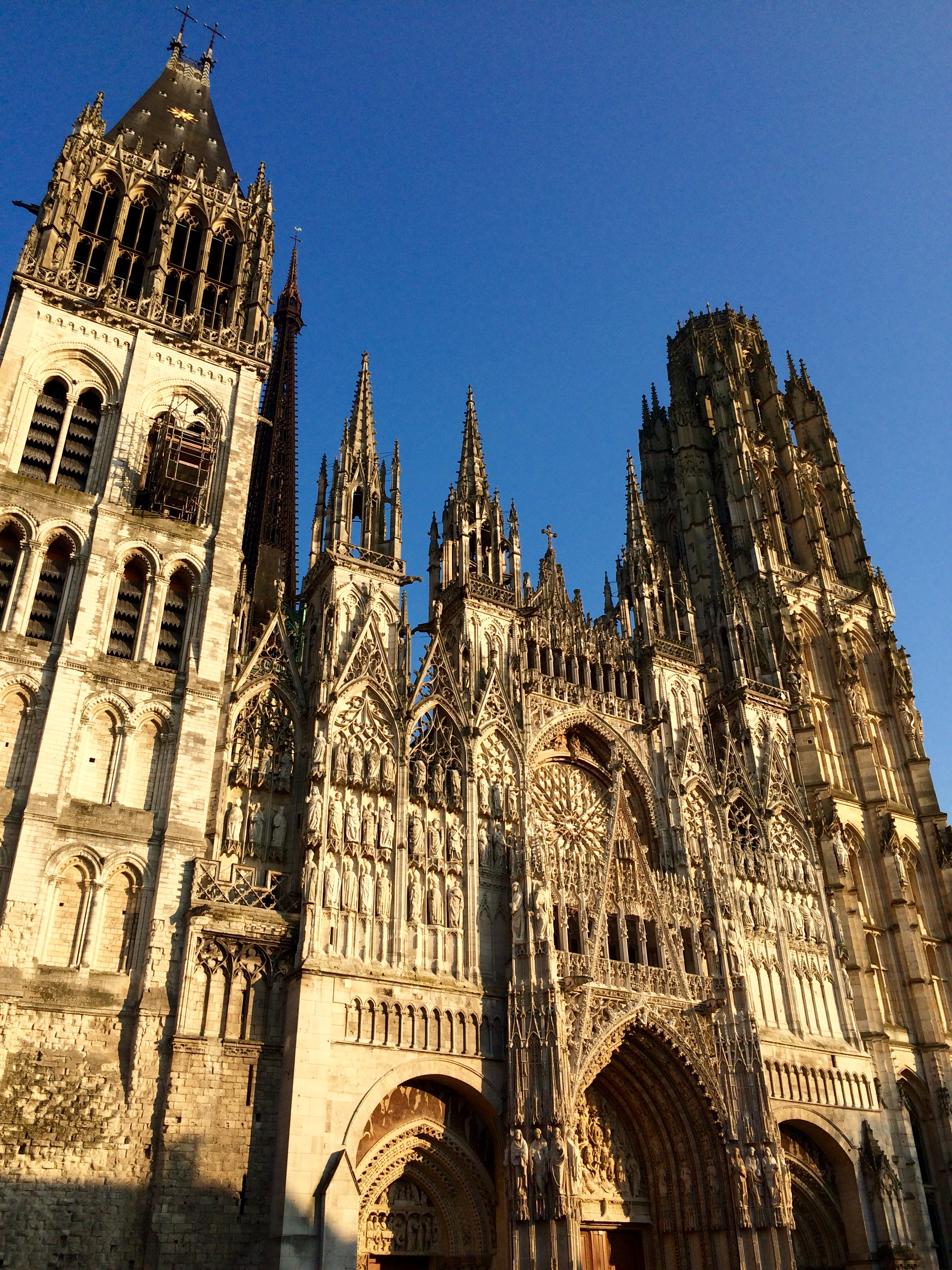
- Rouen Cathedral

Location
- Country: France
- Ecclesiastical province: Rouen

Statistics
- Area: 4,228 km^{2} (1,632 sq mi)
- Population: Total; Catholics: (as of 2022); 872,000; 655,000 (75.1%)
- Parishes: 52

Information
- Denomination: Catholic
- Sui iuris church: Latin Church
- Rite: Roman Rite
- Established: 2nd Century (as Diocese); 5th Century (as Archdiocese)
- Cathedral: Cathedral of Notre Dame in Rouen
- Patron saint: Assumption of Our Lady
- Secular priests: 83 (Diocesan); 22 (Religious Orders); 24 Permanent Deacons

Current leadership
- Pope: Leo XIV
- Metropolitan Archbishop: Dominique Lebrun
- Suffragans: Bayeux and Lisieux; Coutances; Évreux; Le Havre; Sées
- Bishops emeritus: Jean-Charles Descubes

Map

Website
- rouen.catholique.fr

Ecclesiastical province of Rouen

The Archdiocese of Rouen (Latin: Archidioecesis Rothomagensis; French: Archidiocèse de Rouen) is a Latin Church archdiocese of the Catholic Church in France. As one of the fifteen archbishops of France, the Archbishop of Rouen's ecclesiastical province comprises the greater part of Normandy. The Archbishop of Rouen is currently Dominique Lebrun.

In 2022, there was one priest for every 6,238 Catholics in the archdiocese.

== History ==
According to legend, developed in the 11th century, the diocese was founded by Nicasius, a disciple of St. Denis who was martyred after arriving in Normandy towards the end of the first century on a mission from Pope Clement I. Most of the episcopal lists of the Diocese of Rouen, however, omit Nicasius' name.

The archdiocese was based on the Roman province of Lugdunensis secunda in the Tetrachy of 295.

Rouen became an archdiocese probably around 744 with the accession of Grimo. The archdiocese effectively collapsed as a result of tenth century Viking raids. Archbishop Franco baptized Rollo of Normandy in 911, the Normans became enthusiastic church reformers and the archbishops were involved in the Norman Conquest of England in 1066. Normandy was annexed to France in 1204, and Rouen was later occupied by England from 1419 to 1449 during the Hundred Years' War. In 1562 the city was briefly captured by Huguenots during the French Wars of Religion.

The suffragan dioceses of Rouen in the Middle Ages were Évreux, Avranches, Seès, Bayeux, Lisieux, and Coutances. Today its suffragans are the Diocese of Évreux, the Diocese of Bayeux and Lisieux, the Diocese of Coutances, the Diocese of Le Havre, and the Diocese of Sées.

The seat of the archbishop is the 13th century Gothic Rouen Cathedral. The Cathedral Chapter is composed of ten dignitaries (the Dean, the Precentor, the Treasurer, the Archdeacon Major, the Archdeacon Augi (Eu), the Archdeacon of Cales-Major (Grand-Caux), the Archdeacon of Velocassium Franciae (Vexin Français), the Archdeacon of Velocassium Normanniae (Vexin Normande), the Archdeacon of Cales-Minor (Petit-Caux), and the Chancellor); in addition there were forty-seven Canons (which included the offices of Succentor, Theologian and Penitentiary).

In addition to the right to nominate the Archbishop of Rouen (from the Treaty of Bologna of 1516, between Francis I and Leo X), the King of France also enjoyed the right of nomination of a considerable number of benefices in the archdiocese. These included: twenty-four abbeys; fourteen priories; the Dean and Canons of the Church of Notre-Dame-de-la-Ronde in Rouen; and the Dean and nine prebends of the Church of Saint-Mellon-de-Pontoise.

The cathedral was heavily damaged, along with other buildings in Rouen, during World War II and later rebuilt. The archdiocese was the site of the terrorist attack at the church of Saint-Étienne-du-Rouvray, on 26 July 2016.

== Bishops ==
- Nicasius (c. 250)
- Mellonius (260–311)
- Avitianus (311–325)
- Severus (325–341)
- Eusebius (c. 341–366)
- Marcellinus (366–385)
- Peter I (385–393)
- Victricius (393–417)
- Innocent (417–c. 426)
- Sylvester (c. 426–442)
- Malsonus (c. 442–451)
- Germanus (c. 451–462)
- Crescentius (c. 462–488)
- Godardus (c. 488–525), Gildard, Gildardus
- Filleul (525–542)
- Evodus (542–550)
- Saint Praetextatus (550–586)
- Melantius (589–602)
- Hidulphus (602–631)
- Romanus (631–640)
- Saint Ouen (641–689)
- Ansbert (689–693)
- Grippo (695–c. 719)
- Roland (c. 719–c. 732)
- Hugh of Champagne (720–730)
- Robert I (740–744)

== Archbishops ==
=== 744–1000 ===
- Grimo (744–c. 748)
- Ragenfred (748–753)
- Remigius (753–762)
- Hugh II (762–769)
- Meinhard (769–c. 800)
- Gilbert (800–828)
- Ragnoard (828–836)
- Gombaud (836–849)
- Paul (849–855)
- Wenilo (858–869)
- Adalard (869–872)
- Riculf (872–876)
- John I (876–889)
- Wito (889–c. 910)
- Franco (911–919)
- Gonthard (919–942)
- Hugh III (942–989)
- Robert II (990–1037)

=== 1000–1400 ===
- Mauger (1037–1055)
- Maurilius (1055–1067)
- John II (1067–1078)
- William I Bonne-Âme (1079–1110)
- Geoffrey Brito (1111–1128)
- Hugh de Boves (1129–1164)
- Rotrou (1165–1184)
- Walter de Coutances (1184–1208)
- Robert III Poulain (1208–1222)
- Thibaud d'Amiens (1222–1231)
- Maurice (1231–1237)
- Peter II de Colmieu (1237–1245)
- Eudes I Clement (1245–1247)
- Eudes II Rigaud (1247–1276)
- William II de Flavacourt (1276–1306)
- Bernard de Fargis (1306–1311)
- Gilles I Aycelin de Montaigu (1311–1319)
- William III de Durfort (1319–1331)
- Peter III Roger de Beaufort (1331–1338)
- Aimery Guenaud (1338–1342)
- Nicolas I Roger (1342–1347)
- John III de Marigny (1347–1351)
- Peter IV de la Forêt (1351–1356)
- William IV de Flavacourt (1356–1369)
- Philippe of Alençon (1369–1375)
- Peter V de la Montre (1375)
- William V de Lestranges (1375–1388)
- William VI de Vienne, O.S.B. (1389–1406) (Avignon Obedience)

=== 1400–1800 ===
- Louis I d'Harcourt (1406–1422)
- Jean de La Roche-Taillée (1422–1430)
- Hugh V des Orges (1430–1436)
- Louis II de Luxemburg (1436–1443)
- Raoul Roussel (1443–1455)
- Guillaume d'Estouteville (1453–1482)
- Robert IV de Croixmare (1482–1494)
- Georges d'Amboise (1493–1510)
- Georges II d'Amboise (1510–1550)
- Charles I, Cardinal de Bourbon (1550–1590)
- Charles II de Bourbon-Vendôme (1590–1594)
- Charles III de Bourbon (1594–1604)
- François de Joyeuse (1605–1614)
- François II de Harlay (1614–1651)
- François de Harlay de Champvallon (1651–1672)
- François IV Rouxel de Médavy de Grancey (1672–1691)
- Jacques-Nicolas Colbert (1691–1707)
- Claude-Maur d'Aubigné (1708–1719)
- Armand Bazin de Bezons (1719–1720)
- Louis de La Vergne-Montenard de Tressan (1724–1733)
- Nicolas II de Saulx-Tavannes (1734–1759)
- Dominique de La Rochefoucauld (1759–1800)
  - Jean-François Leverdier (Constitutional Bishop-elect, Metropolitan of Côtes-de-la-Manche) (1791)
  - Louis Charrier de la Roche (Constitutional Bishop)

=== 1800–present ===
vacant after the French Revolution (1790–1802)

- Etienne-Hubert Cambacérès (1802–1818)
- François de Pierre de Bernis (1819–1823)
- Gustave Maximilien Juste de Croÿ-Solre (1823–1844)
- Louis-Marie-Edmond Blanquart de Bailleul (1844–1858)
- Henri de Bonnechose (1858–1883)
- Léon Thomas (1883–1894)
- Guillaume Sourrieu (1894–1899)
- Frédéric Fuzet (1899–1916)
- Louis-Ernest Dubois (1916–1920)
- André du Bois de La Villerabel (1920–1936)
- Pierre-André-Charles Petit de Julleville (1936–1947)
- Joseph-Marie Martin (1948–1968)
- André Pailler (1968–1981)
- Joseph Duval (1981–2004)
- Jean-Charles Descubes (2004–2015)
- Dominique Lebrun (2015–present)

== See also ==
- Roman Catholicism in France
- Saint-Louis Church, Rouen

== Bibliography ==
=== Reference works ===
- Gams, Pius Bonifatius (1873). Series episcoporum Ecclesiae catholicae: quotquot innotuerunt a beato Petro apostolo. Ratisbon: Typis et Sumptibus Georgii Josephi Manz. (Use with caution; obsolete)
- Eubel, Conradus, ed. (1913). Hierarchia catholica, Tomus 1 (second ed.). Münster: Libreria Regensbergiana. (in Latin)
- Eubel, Conradus, ed. (1914). Hierarchia catholica, Tomus 2 (second ed.). Münster: Libreria Regensbergiana. (in Latin)
- Eubel, Conradus, ed. (1923). Hierarchia catholica, Tomus 3 (second ed.). Münster: Libreria Regensbergiana.
- Gauchat, Patritius (Patrice) (1935). Hierarchia catholica IV (1592-1667). Münster: Libraria Regensbergiana.
- Ritzler, Remigius; Sefrin, Pirminus (1952). Hierarchia catholica medii et recentis aevi V (1667-1730). Patavii: Messagero di S. Antonio.
- Ritzler, Remigius; Sefrin, Pirminus (1958). Hierarchia catholica medii et recentis aevi VI (1730-1799). Patavii: Messagero di S. Antonio.

=== Studies ===
- Douglas, David C. (May 1964). William the Conqueror: The Norman Impact Upon England.
- Duchesne, Louis (1910). Fastes épiscopaux de l'ancienne Gaule: II. L'Aquitaine et les Lyonnaises. Paris: Fontemoing.
- Du Tems, Hugues (1774). Le clergé de France, ou tableau historique et chronologique des archevêques, évêques, abbés, abbesses et chefs des chapitres principaux du royaume, depuis la fondation des églises jusqu'à nos jours (in French). Vol. Tome premier. Paris: Delalain.
- Jean, Armand (1891). Les évêques et les archevêques de France depuis 1682 jusqu'à 1801 (in French). Paris: A. Picard.
- Chaline, Nadine-Josette (1976). Le Diocèse de Rouen-Le Havre (in French). Paris: Éditions Beauchesne.
- Congregation of Saint-Maur, ed. (1759). Gallia Christiana: In Provincias Ecclesiasticas Distributa... De provincia Rotomagensi, ejusque metropoli ac suffraganeis ... ac Constantiensi ecclesiis (in Latin). Paris: Typographia Regia.
- Fisquet, Honoré (1864). La France pontificale (Gallia Christiana): histoire chronologique et biographique...Metropole de Rouen: Rouen (in French). Paris: Etienne Repos.
- Longnon, Auguste, ed. (1903). Recueil des historiens de la France: Pouillés (in French and Latin). Vol. Tome II: La province de Rouen. Paris: Imprimerie nationale.
- Sauvage, Eugene Paul Marie (Abbe) (1884). Actes des saints du diocèse de Rouen (in French). Vol. Tome I. Rouen: E. Fleury.
- Tabbagh, Vincent (ed.) (1998): Fasti Ecclesiae Gallicanae. Répertoire prosopographique des évêques, dignitaires et chanoines des diocèses de France de 1200 à 1500. II. Diocèse de Rouen. Turnhout, Brepols. (in French)
- Société bibliographique (France) (1907). L'épiscopat français depuis le Concordat jusqu'à la Séparation (1802-1905). Paris: Librairie des Saints-Pères.
