= Communauté de communes Cœur de Combrailles =

Coordinates: 46.031°N 2.8192°E

Cœur de Combrailles
- Former communauté de communes
- Interactive map of Cœur de Combrailles
- Country: France
- Region: Auvergne-Rhône-Alpes
- Department: Puy-de-Dôme
- No. of communes: {{{nbcomm}}}
- Established: October 1999
- Disbanded: 2017
- Area: 261.44 km^{2} (100.94 sq mi)
- Population (2013): 4,142
  - Density: 15.84/km^{2} (41.03/sq mi)

The Communauté de communes Coeur de Combrailles is a former communauté de communes in the Puy-de-Dôme département and in the Auvergne-Rhône-Alpes région of France. It was created in October 1999. It was merged into the new Communauté de communes du Pays de Saint-Éloy in January 2017.

== Composition ==
This Communauté de communes comprised 10 communes:

1. Ayat-sur-Sioule
2. Biollet
3. Charensat
4. Espinasse
5. Gouttières
6. Saint-Gervais-d'Auvergne
7. Saint-Julien-la-Geneste
8. Saint-Priest-des-Champs
9. Sainte-Christine
10. Sauret-Besserve

== See also ==
- Communes of the Puy-de-Dôme department
