= Menat, Puy-de-Dôme =

Menat
- Commune
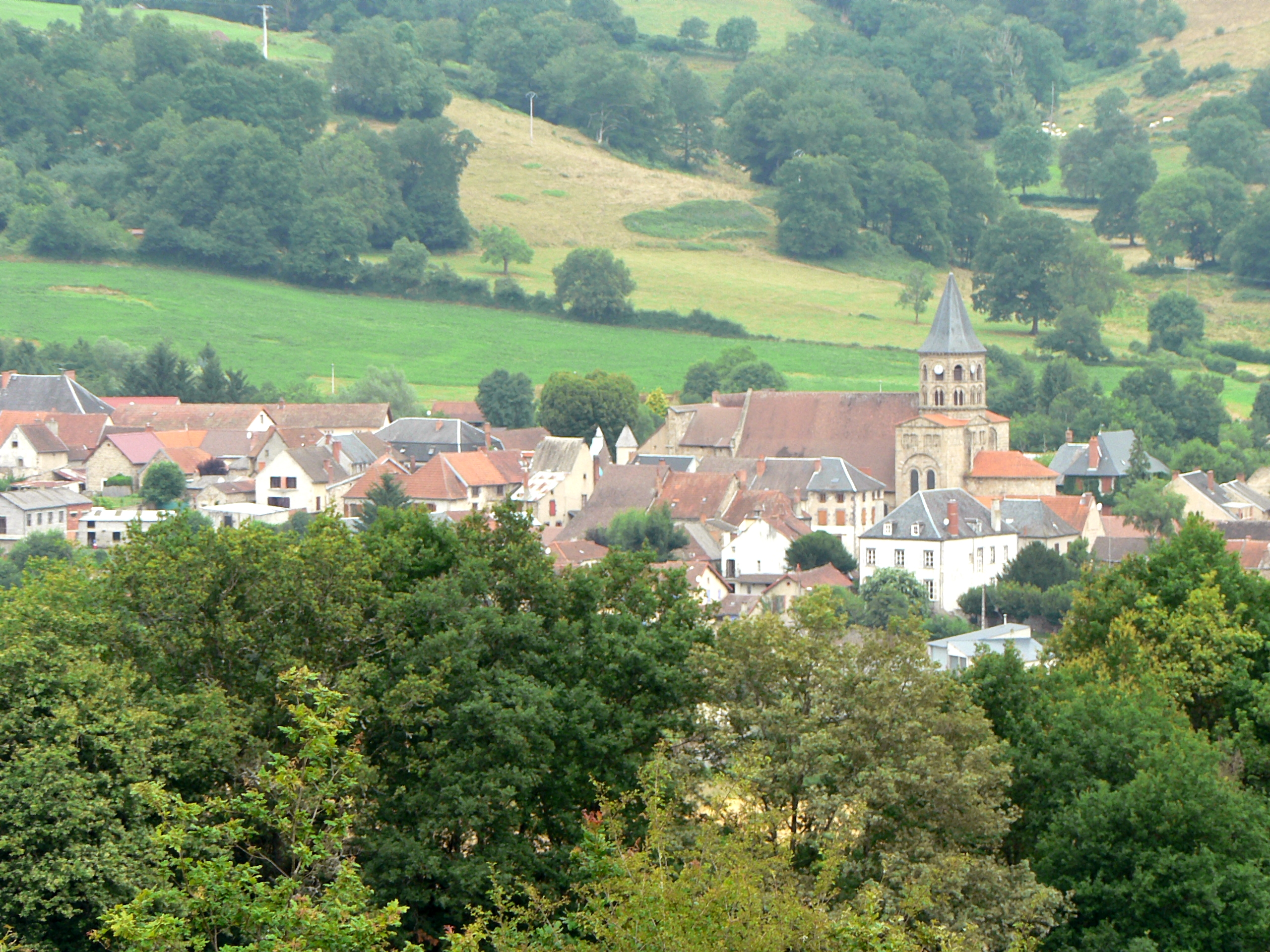
- Village de Menat

- Coat of arms
- Location of Menat
- Location within France Location within Auvergne-Rhône-Alpes
- Coordinates: 46°06′16″N 2°54′19″E
- Country: France
- Region: Auvergne-Rhône-Alpes
- Department: Puy-de-Dôme
- Arrondissement: Riom
- Canton: Saint-Éloy-les-Mines
- Intercommunality: CC Pays de Saint-Éloy

Government
  - Mayor (2026–32): Jean-Yves Arnaud
- Area^{1}: 20.31 km^{2} (7.84 sq mi)
- Highest elevation: 674 m (2,211 ft)
- Lowest elevation: 346 m (1,135 ft)
- Population (2023): 547
  - Density: 26.9/km^{2} (69.8/sq mi)
- Demonym: Menatois
- Time zone: UTC+01:00 (CET)
  - Summer (DST): UTC+02:00 (CEST)
- INSEE/Postal code: 63223 /63560
- Website: www.commune-de-menat.com
- ^{1} French Land Register data, which excludes lakes, ponds, glaciers > 1 km^{2} (0.386 sq mi or 247 acres) and river estuaries.

Menat (French pronunciation: [məna]) is a commune in the Puy-de-Dôme department in Auvergne-Rhône-Alpes in central France. It is in the heart of the valley of Sioule.

Its neighboring municipalities are Saint-Éloy-les-Mines, Youx, Moureuille, Servant, Pouzol, Neuf-Église, Ayat-sur-Sioule, and Saint-Rémy-de-Blot.

== Locations ==
The Menat Abbey (fr) is an abbey in the village of Menat. It is one of the oldest monastic foundations in Auvergne.

The Pont de Menat (fr) is a medieval bridge connecting Menat to adjacent Saint-Rémy-de-Blot.

== Gastronomy ==
The pâté aux pommes de terre and, the "pain des Combrailles" are specialties of the region.

== Fossils ==
Menat is the site of a lagerstätte dating to 56 million years ago. Many fossils have been discovered extracted from the shales. A dedicated museum was inaugurated in 1980 and housed in the former abbey castle (now town hall).

Paleocene bird fossils have been discovered in Menat, including Halcyornithidae, Messelasturidae, and relatives of Songziidae.

== See also ==
- Communes of the Puy-de-Dôme department
