= Espinasse, Puy-de-Dôme =

Espinasse
- Commune
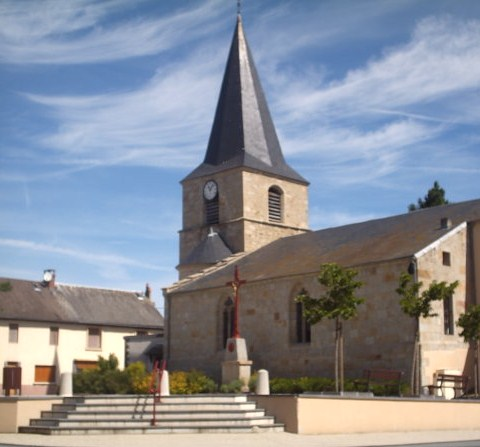
- The church in Espinasse
- Location of Espinasse
- Location within France Location within Auvergne-Rhône-Alpes
- Coordinates: 46°02′19″N 2°42′43″E
- Country: France
- Region: Auvergne-Rhône-Alpes
- Department: Puy-de-Dôme
- Arrondissement: Riom
- Canton: Saint-Éloy-les-Mines
- Intercommunality: CC Pays de Saint-Éloy

Government
  - Mayor (2020–2026): Michel Bancarel
- Area^{1}: 23.95 km^{2} (9.25 sq mi)
- Elevation: 680 m (2,230 ft)
- Highest elevation: 774 m (2,539 ft)
- Lowest elevation: 598 m (1,962 ft)
- Population (2023): 274
  - Density: 11.4/km^{2} (29.6/sq mi)
- Time zone: UTC+01:00 (CET)
  - Summer (DST): UTC+02:00 (CEST)
- INSEE/Postal code: 63152 /63390
- Website: www.espinasse63.com
- ^{1} French Land Register data, which excludes lakes, ponds, glaciers > 1 km^{2} (0.386 sq mi or 247 acres) and river estuaries.

Espinasse (French pronunciation: [ɛspinas]; Occitan: Espinassa) is a commune in the Puy-de-Dôme department in Auvergne in central France. Small farming village in the Pays of Combrailles, in the canton of Saint-Éloy-les-Mines, the village is nestled in a hollow, about nine kilometers west of the town of Saint-Gervais-d'Auvergne.

During the Middle Ages and the Early modern period, the region of Combrailles was of paramount importance at territorial level because it was located at the crossroads of several lordships (Bourbonnais, Auvergne and Limousin). Therefore, the town of Espinasse suffered this proximity and was divided into fiefs belonging among others to the House of Le Loup, the House of Montmorency and the House of La Fayette.

== Geography ==
Espinasse is located some 30 km west of Combronde and 23 km north-west of Bromont-Lamothe. Access to the commune is by the D 13 from Charensat in the south-west which passes through the commune and the village before continuing north to Pionsat. The D 62 comes from Saint-Priest-des-Champs in the south-east. The D 18 comes from Saint-Julien-la-Geneste in the north-east. The D 528 comes from Bussières in the north-west. The commune is mixed forest and farmland.

=== Neighbouring communes and villages ===
Source:

== Administration ==
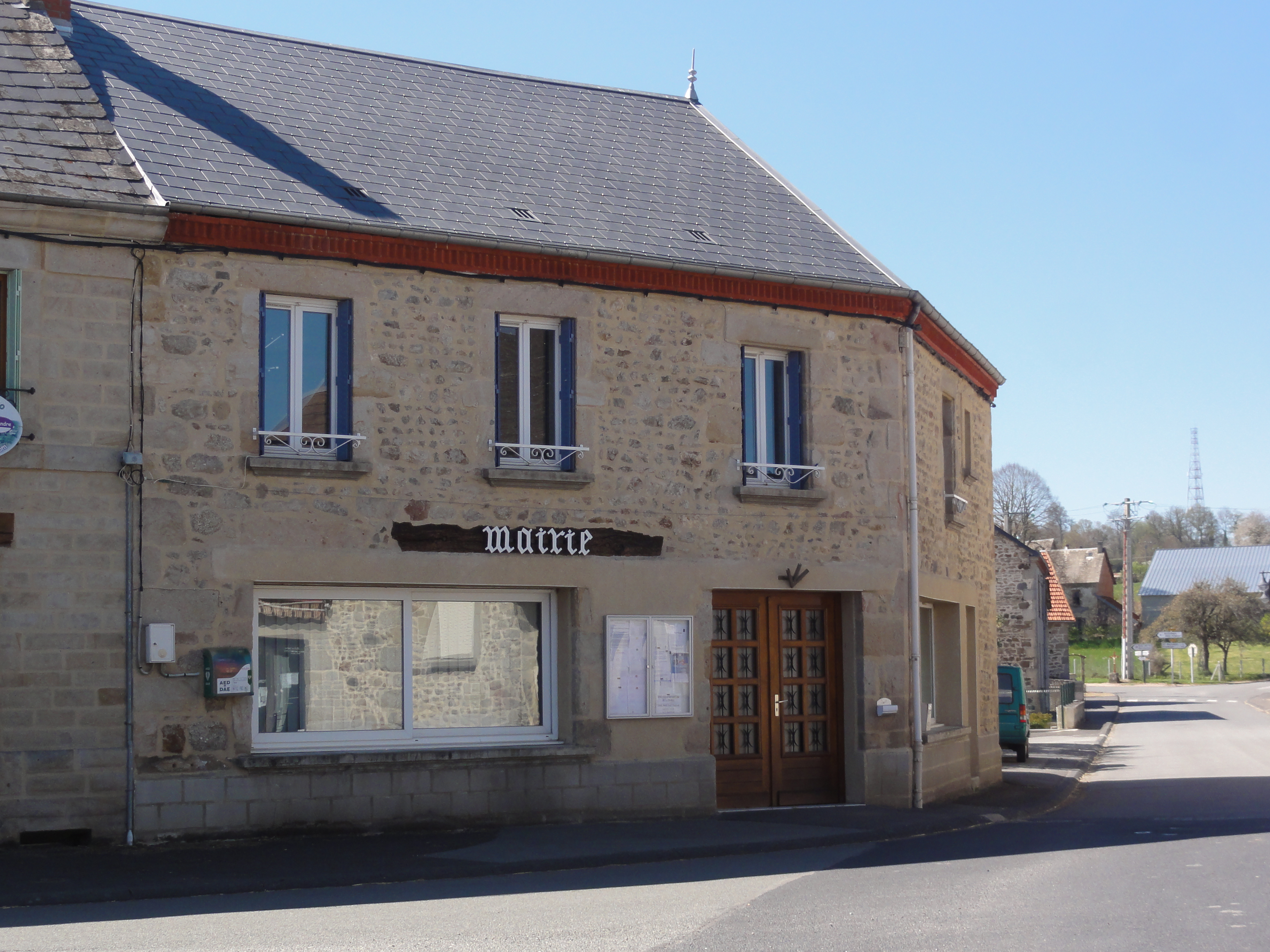
Espinasse Town Hall

List of Successive Mayors since 1800

From	To	Name
1800	1808	Gilbert Gory
1808	1813	Annet Lecuyer
1813	1815	Jean-Joseph Boutarel
1815	1816	Paul Sanne
1816	1818	Amable Nouhen
1819	1830	Charles Marien Baron
1830	1840	Claude Fribaud
1840	1849	Charles Marien Baron
1849	1875	Frédéric Gory
1875	1877	Marien Martin
1877	1885	Jean Chabry
1885	1889	Marien Lecuyer
1889	1893	François Carton
1893	1895	Gilbert Martin
1895	1904	Etienne Gory
1904	1912	Annet Charvillat
1912	1944	Eugène Charvillat
1944	1959	Michel Carte
1959	1975	Roger Laroche
1975	2005	François Gardet
2005	2020	Marc Gidel
2020	2026	Michel Bancarel

== Demography ==
The inhabitants of the commune are known as Espinassois or Espinassoises in French.

Historical population

Year	Pop.	±% p.a.
1793	837	—
1800	823	−0.24%
1806	735	−1.87%
1821	1,021	+2.22%
1831	1,025	+0.04%
1836	1,018	−0.14%
1841	1,124	+2.00%
1846	1,200	+1.32%
1851	1,182	−0.30%
1856	1,152	−0.51%
1861	1,156	+0.07%
1866	1,082	−1.31%
1872	1,082	+0.00%
1876	1,117	+0.80%
1881	1,139	+0.39%
1886	1,191	+0.90%
1891	1,220	+0.48%
1896	1,105	−1.96%
1901	1,157	+0.92%

Year	Pop.	±% p.a.
1906	1,024	−2.41%
1911	974	−1.00%
1921	952	−0.23%
1926	903	−1.05%
1931	771	−3.11%
1936	739	−0.84%
1946	633	−1.54%
1954	593	−0.81%
1962	543	−1.10%
1968	507	−1.14%
1975	411	−2.95%
1982	355	−2.07%
1990	274	−3.19%
1999	285	+0.44%
2007	320	+1.46%
2012	297	−1.48%
2017	294	−0.20%
2023	274	−1.17%

Source: EHESS and INSEE

== Culture and heritage ==
=== Cultural events and festivities ===
The Hay Fest (La Fête des Foins in French) is the main festival in the village since 1998. It takes place in July.

=== Tourist monuments and places ===
- The Church of St. Martin, very old, is partly Romanesque but was changed to the 2nd Gothic era. A statuary element painted white stone shows St. Margaret of Antioch slaying the dragon. It dates from the fifteenth century. Saint Martin is the patron of the parish but is also under the protection of Saint Gal, second patron.
- The local school, completed in 1900, was also a town hall. The building was called Mairie-École at the time.
- The Résistance site at Cacherat - Camp Gabriel Peri - which received on 23 October 1943, one of the two groups of escapees from the prison of Le Puy-en-Velay.
- The Château of Pierrebrune, dating from the thirteenth century, rebuilt to modern, was the residence of the lords of Espinasse. In June 1440 during the Praguerie, King Charles VII, who came from Auzances and went to Montaigut-en-Combraille, passed through Pierrebrune.
- The War Memorial in front of the church.
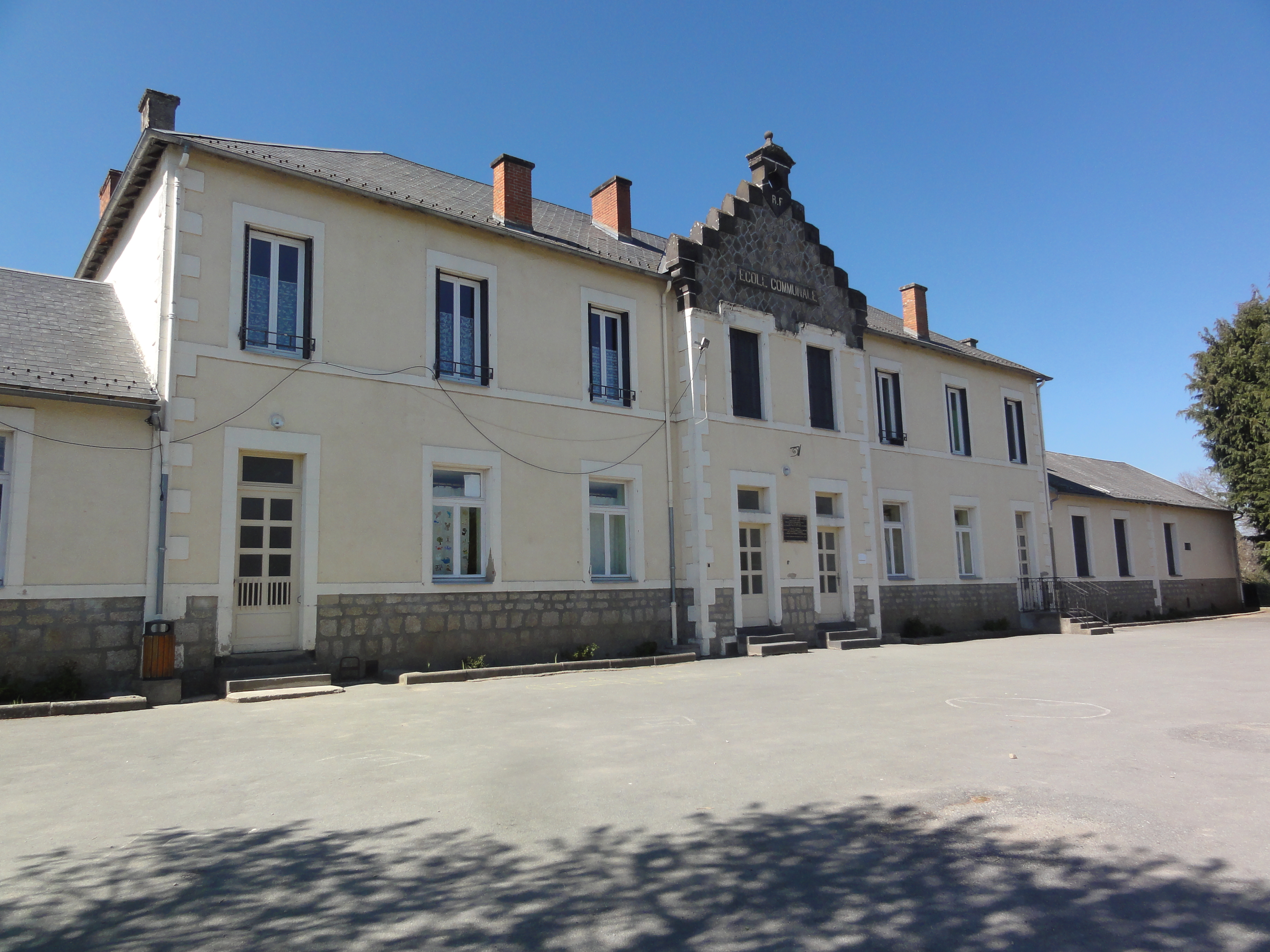
The local school

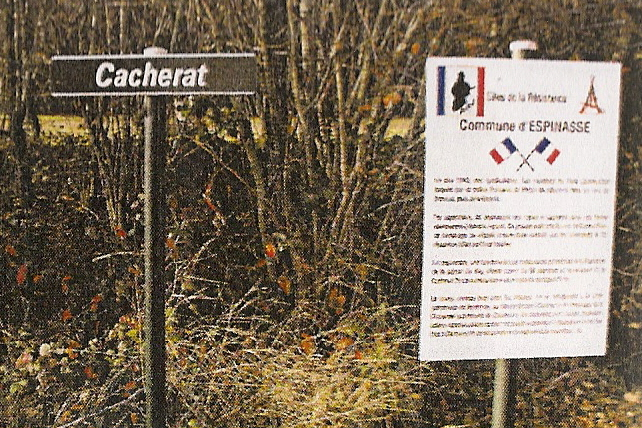
The Resistance site at Cacherat

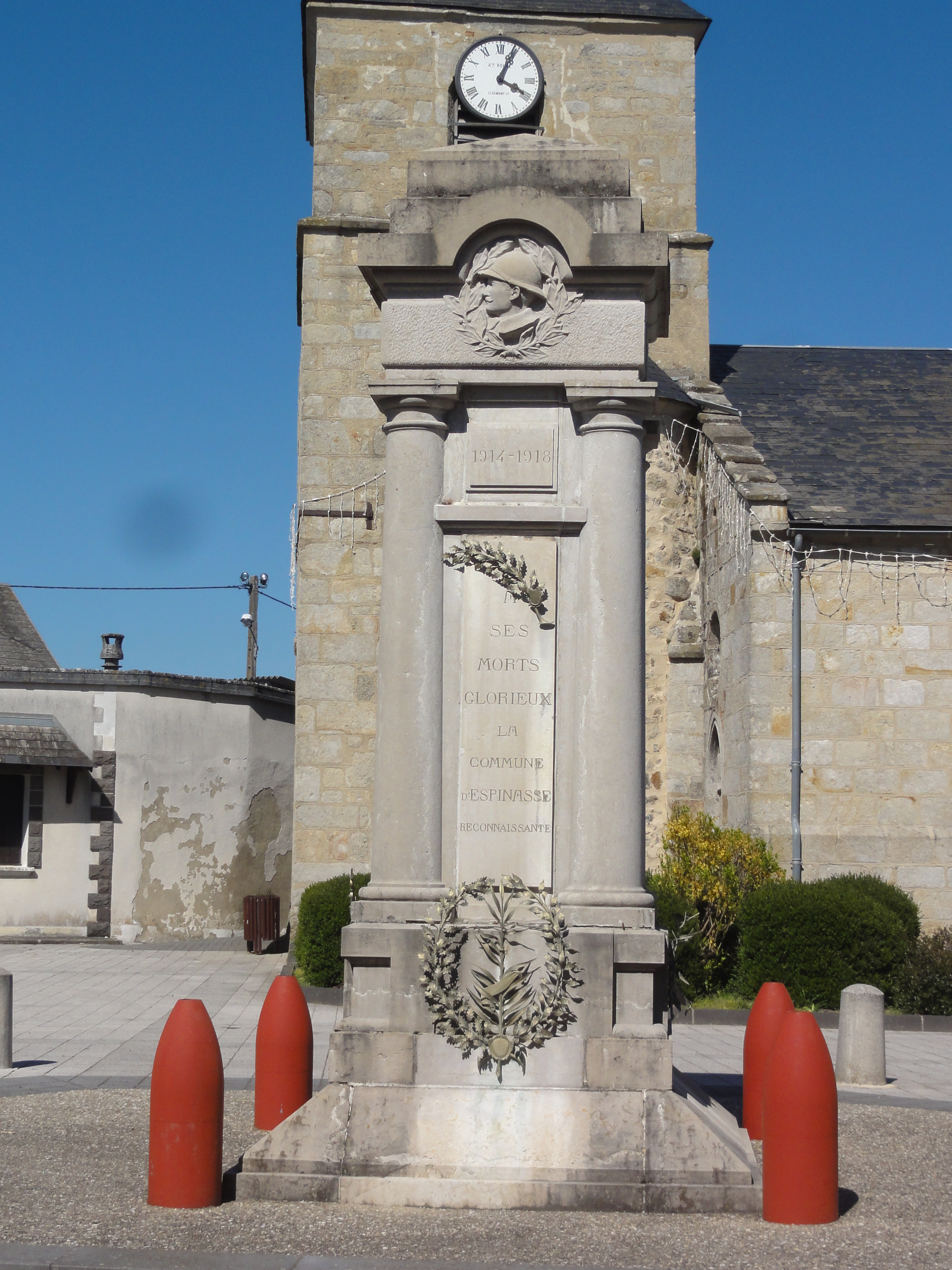
The War Memorial

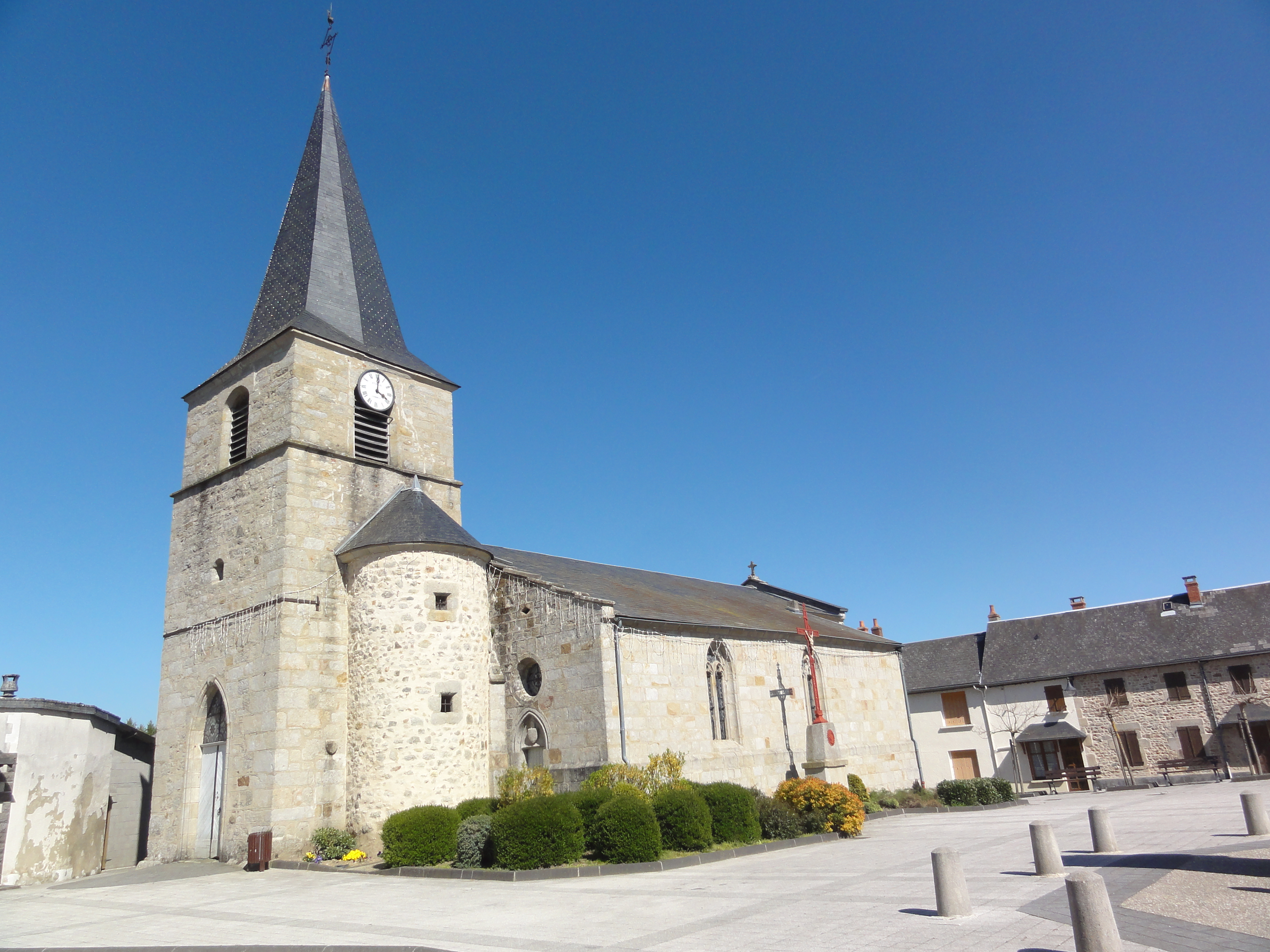
The Church of St. Martin

== See also ==
- Communes of the Puy-de-Dôme department
