= Bussières (disambiguation) =

Bussières is a surname. It may also refer to the following communes in France:

- Bussières, Côte-d'Or, in the Côte-d'Or department
- Bussières, Loire, in the Loire department
- Bussières, Puy-de-Dôme, in the Puy-de-Dôme department
- Bussières, Haute-Saône, in the Haute-Saône department
- Bussières, Saône-et-Loire, in the Saône-et-Loire department
- Bussières, Seine-et-Marne, in the Seine-et-Marne department
- Bussières, Yonne, in the Yonne department
- Bussières-et-Pruns, in the Puy-de-Dôme department
- Chambley-Bussières, in the Meurthe-et-Moselle department

== See also ==
- Bussière (disambiguation)
- La Bussière (disambiguation)
