= Bussière (disambiguation) =

Bussière is a surname. It may also refer to the following communes in France:

- Bussière-Badil, in the Dordogne department
- Bussière-Boffy, in the Haute-Vienne department
- Bussière-Dunoise, in the Creuse department
- Bussière-Galant, in the Haute-Vienne department
- Bussière-Nouvelle, in the Creuse department
- Bussière-Poitevine, in the Haute-Vienne department
- Bussière-Saint-Georges, in the Creuse department
- La Serre-Bussière-Vieille, in the Creuse department
- Saint-Barthélemy-de-Bussière, in the Dordogne department
- Saint-Jean-la-Bussière, in the Rhône department
- Saint-Léger-sous-la-Bussière, in the Saône-et-Loire department

== See also ==
- La Bussière (disambiguation)
- Bussières (disambiguation)
