= Antoine Villedieu =

Antoine Villedieu may refer to:

- Antoine Villedieu (20th-century politician) (1887–1947), French politician
- Antoine Villedieu (21st-century politician) (born 1989), French politician
