= Buxières-sous-Montaigut =

- Commune
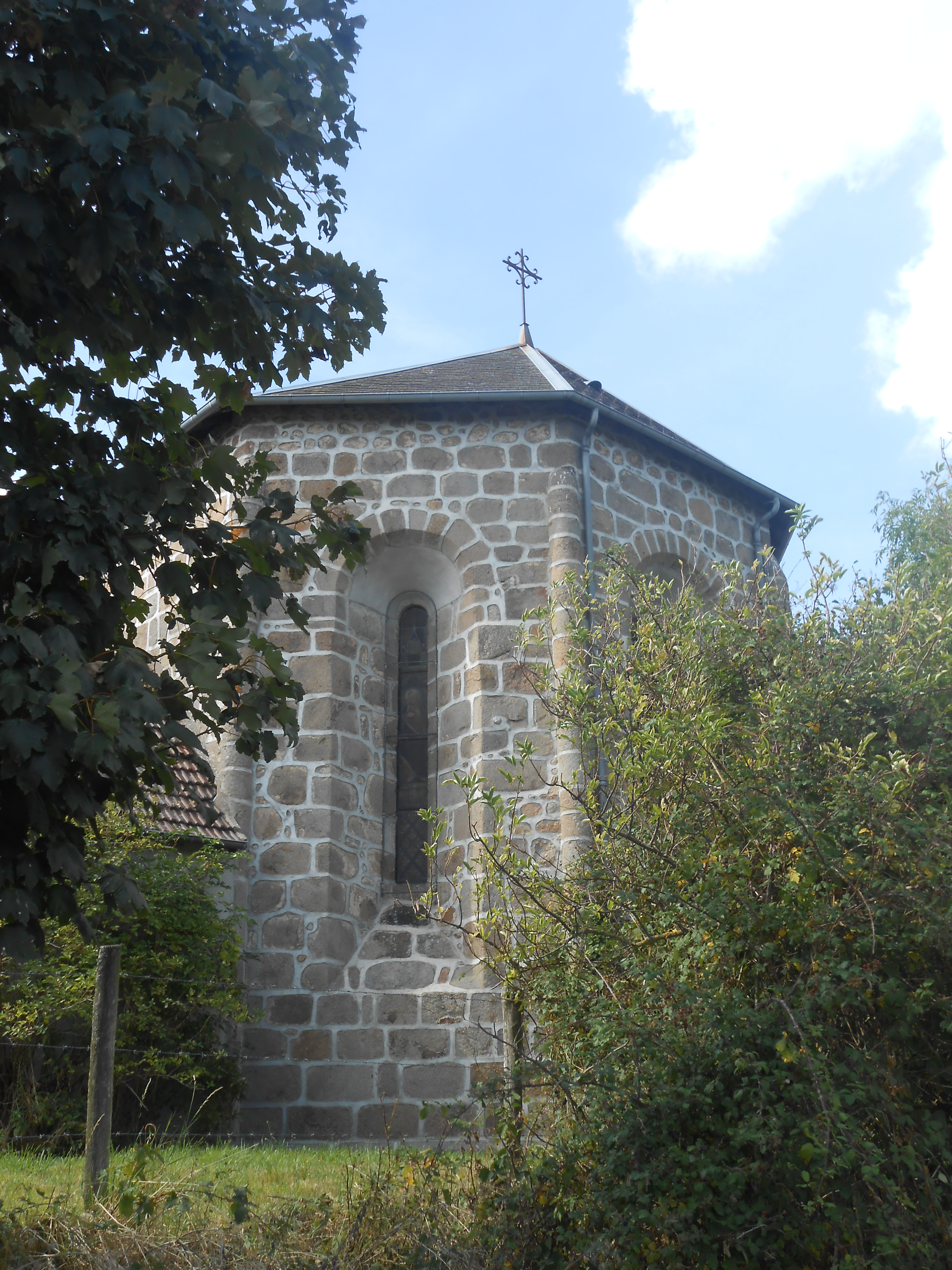
- The church in Buxières-sous-Montaigut

- Coat of arms
- Location of Buxières-sous-Montaigut
- Location within France Location within Auvergne-Rhône-Alpes
- Coordinates: 46°12′14″N 2°50′55″E
- Country: France
- Region: Auvergne-Rhône-Alpes
- Department: Puy-de-Dôme
- Arrondissement: Riom
- Canton: Saint-Éloy-les-Mines
- Intercommunality: CC Pays de Saint-Éloy

Government
  - Mayor (2020–2026): Roger Ollier
- Area^{1}: 10.88 km^{2} (4.20 sq mi)
- Highest elevation: 631 m (2,070 ft)
- Lowest elevation: 491 m (1,611 ft)
- Population (2023): 244
  - Density: 22.4/km^{2} (58.1/sq mi)
- Time zone: UTC+01:00 (CET)
  - Summer (DST): UTC+02:00 (CEST)
- INSEE/Postal code: 63062 /63700
- ^{1} French Land Register data, which excludes lakes, ponds, glaciers > 1 km^{2} (0.386 sq mi or 247 acres) and river estuaries.

Buxières-sous-Montaigut (French pronunciation: [byksjɛʁ su mɔ̃tɛɡy], literally Buxières under Montaigut) is a commune in the Puy-de-Dôme department in Auvergne-Rhône-Alpes in central France.

== Population ==
Historical population
Year	Pop.	±% p.a.
1968	329	—
1975	288	−1.88%
1982	261	−1.40%
1990	243	−0.89%
1999	243	+0.00%
2007	255	+0.60%
2012	230	−2.04%
2017	237	+0.60%
2023	244	+0.49%
Source: INSEE

== See also ==
- Communes of the Puy-de-Dôme department
