= La Cellette, Puy-de-Dôme =

La Cellette
- Commune
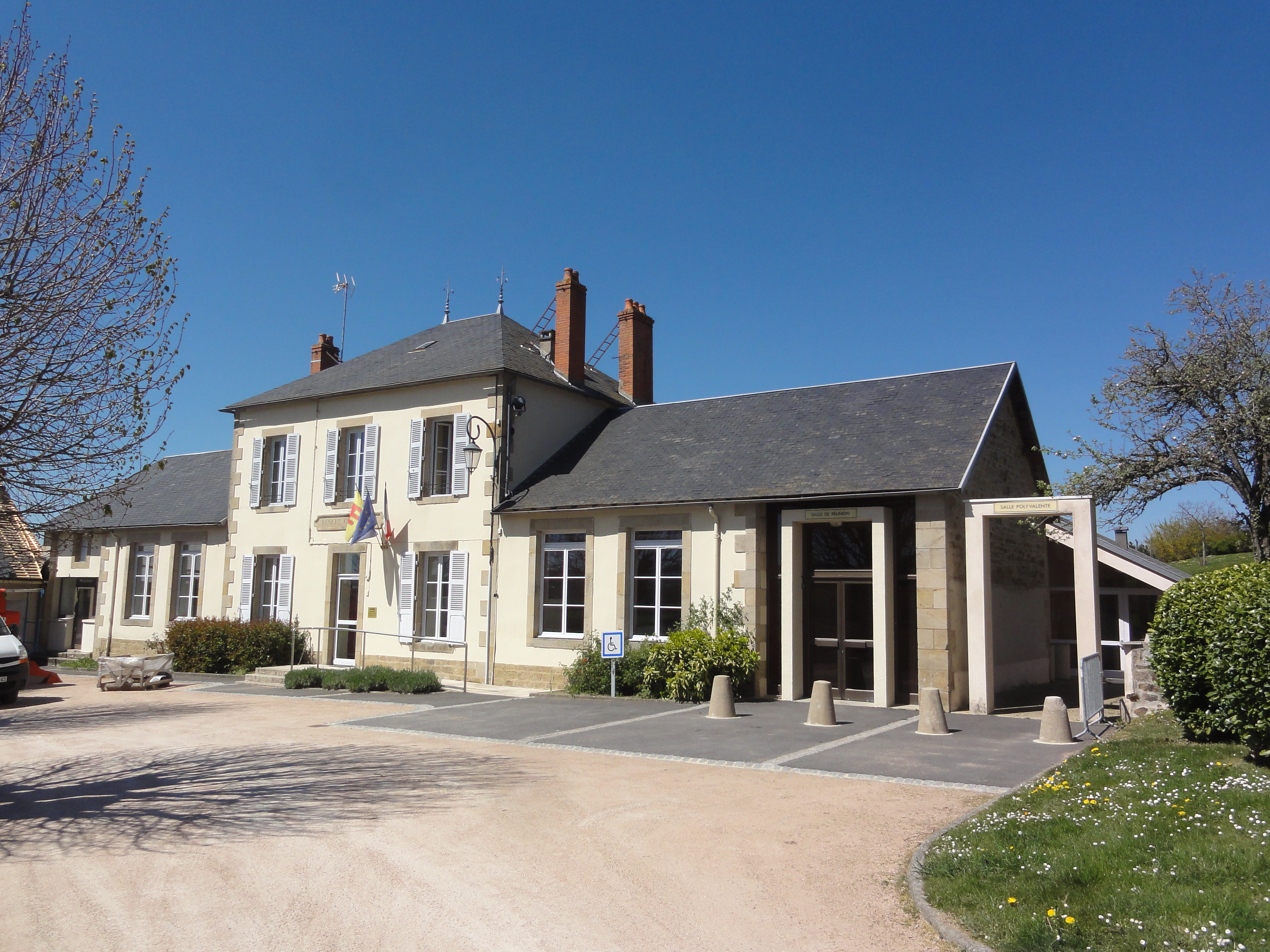
- The town hall and schools in La Cellette
- Location of La Cellette
- Location within France Location within Auvergne-Rhône-Alpes
- Coordinates: 46°06′10″N 2°43′13″E
- Country: France
- Region: Auvergne-Rhône-Alpes
- Department: Puy-de-Dôme
- Arrondissement: Riom
- Canton: Saint-Éloy-les-Mines
- Intercommunality: CC Pays de Saint-Éloy

Government
  - Mayor (2020–2026): Jean-Claude Cazeau
- Area^{1}: 10.99 km^{2} (4.24 sq mi)
- Elevation: 377 m (1,237 ft)
- Highest elevation: 803 m (2,635 ft)
- Lowest elevation: 538 m (1,765 ft)
- Population (2023): 169
  - Density: 15.4/km^{2} (39.8/sq mi)
- Time zone: UTC+01:00 (CET)
  - Summer (DST): UTC+02:00 (CEST)
- INSEE/Postal code: 63067 /63330
- ^{1} French Land Register data, which excludes lakes, ponds, glaciers > 1 km^{2} (0.386 sq mi or 247 acres) and river estuaries.

La Cellette (French pronunciation: [la selɛt]; Occitan: La Celeta) is a commune in the Puy-de-Dôme department in Auvergne-Rhône-Alpes in central France.

== See also ==
- Communes of the Puy-de-Dôme department
