= Communauté de communes du Pays de Saint-Éloy =

Federation of municipalities in France

Pays de Saint-Éloy
- Communauté de communes
- Interactive map of Pays de Saint-Éloy
- Coordinates: 46°11′N 02°50′E
- Country: France
- Region: Auvergne-Rhône-Alpes
- Department: Puy-de-Dôme
- No. of communes: {{{nbcomm}}}
- Established: 2017
- Area: 683.5 km^{2} (263.9 sq mi)
- Population (2018): 15,841
  - Density: 23.18/km^{2} (60.03/sq mi)

The Communauté de communes du Pays de Saint-Éloy is a communauté de communes, an intercommunal structure, in the Puy-de-Dôme department, in the Auvergne-Rhône-Alpes region, central France. It was created in January 2017 by the merger of the former communautés de communes Cœur de Combrailles, Saint-Éloy Communauté and Pionsat, joined by 5 other communes. Its area is 683.5 km^{2}, and its population was 15,841 in 2018. Its seat is in Saint-Éloy-les-Mines.

== Composition ==
The communauté de communes consists of the following 34 communes:

1. Ars-les-Favets
2. Ayat-sur-Sioule
3. Biollet
4. Bussières
5. Buxières-sous-Montaigut
6. La Cellette
7. Charensat
8. Château-sur-Cher
9. La Crouzille
10. Durmignat
11. Espinasse
12. Gouttières
13. Lapeyrouse
14. Menat
15. Montaigut
16. Moureuille
17. Neuf-Église
18. Pionsat
19. Le Quartier
20. Roche-d'Agoux
21. Sainte-Christine
22. Saint-Éloy-les-Mines
23. Saint-Gervais-d'Auvergne
24. Saint-Hilaire
25. Saint-Julien-la-Geneste
26. Saint-Maigner
27. Saint-Maurice-près-Pionsat
28. Saint-Priest-des-Champs
29. Sauret-Besserve
30. Servant
31. Teilhet
32. Vergheas
33. Virlet
34. Youx
