= Roche-d'Agoux =

- Commune
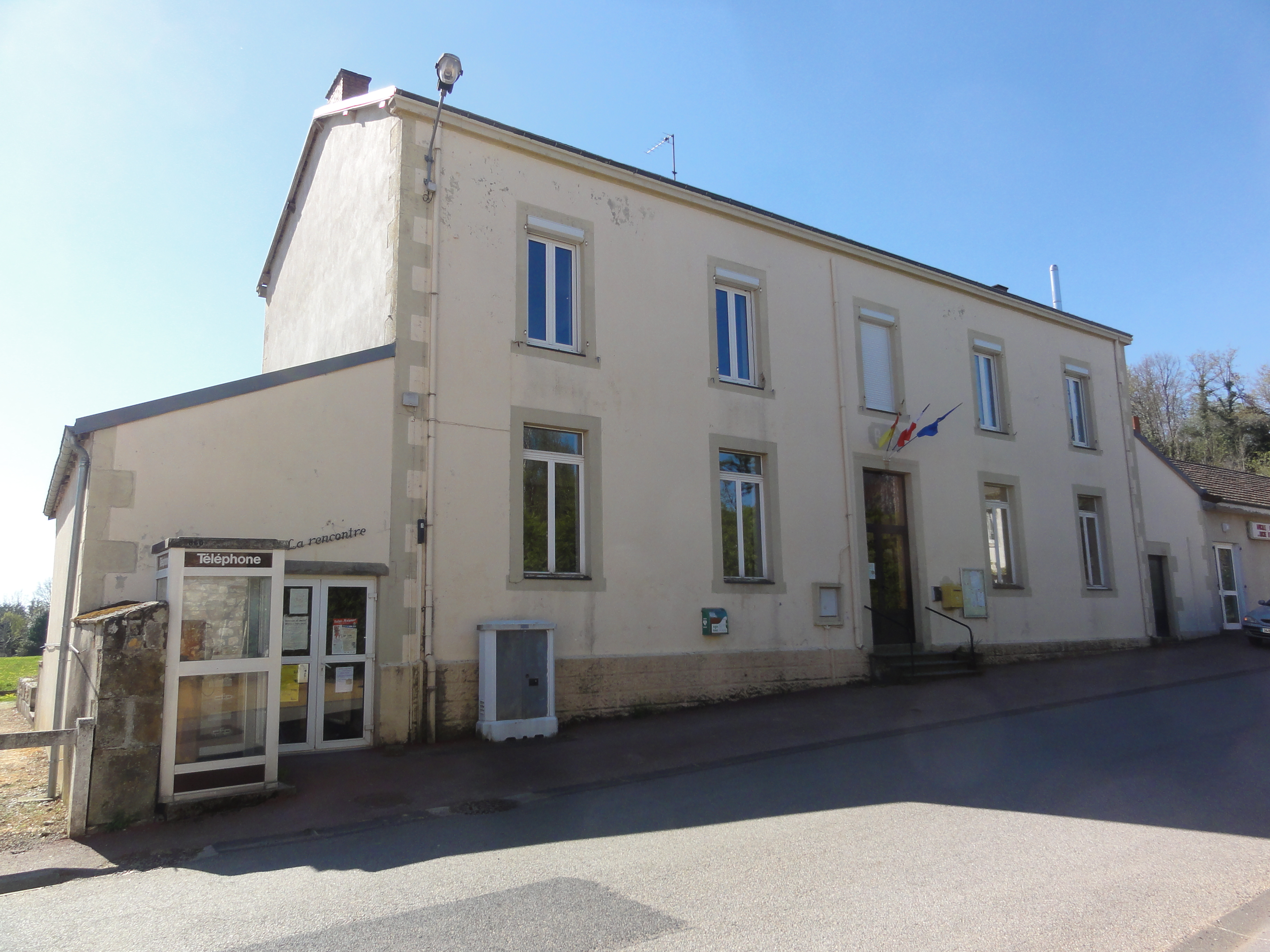
- The town hall in Roche-d'Agoux

- Coat of arms
- Location of Roche-d'Agoux
- Location within France Location within Auvergne-Rhône-Alpes
- Coordinates: 46°02′38″N 2°37′55″E
- Country: France
- Region: Auvergne-Rhône-Alpes
- Department: Puy-de-Dôme
- Arrondissement: Riom
- Canton: Saint-Éloy-les-Mines
- Intercommunality: CC Pays de Saint-Éloy

Government
  - Mayor (2026–32): Laurence Oriol
- Area^{1}: 5.56 km^{2} (2.15 sq mi)
- Elevation: 720 m (2,360 ft)
- Highest elevation: 764 m (2,507 ft)
- Lowest elevation: 576 m (1,890 ft)
- Population (2023): 110
  - Density: 20/km^{2} (51/sq mi)
- Time zone: UTC+01:00 (CET)
  - Summer (DST): UTC+02:00 (CEST)
- INSEE/Postal code: 63304 /63330
- ^{1} French Land Register data, which excludes lakes, ponds, glaciers > 1 km^{2} (0.386 sq mi or 247 acres) and river estuaries.

Roche-d'Agoux (French pronunciation: [ʁɔʃ daɡu]) is a commune in the Puy-de-Dôme department in Auvergne in central France.

== See also ==
- Communes of the Puy-de-Dôme department
