= Vergheas =

- Commune
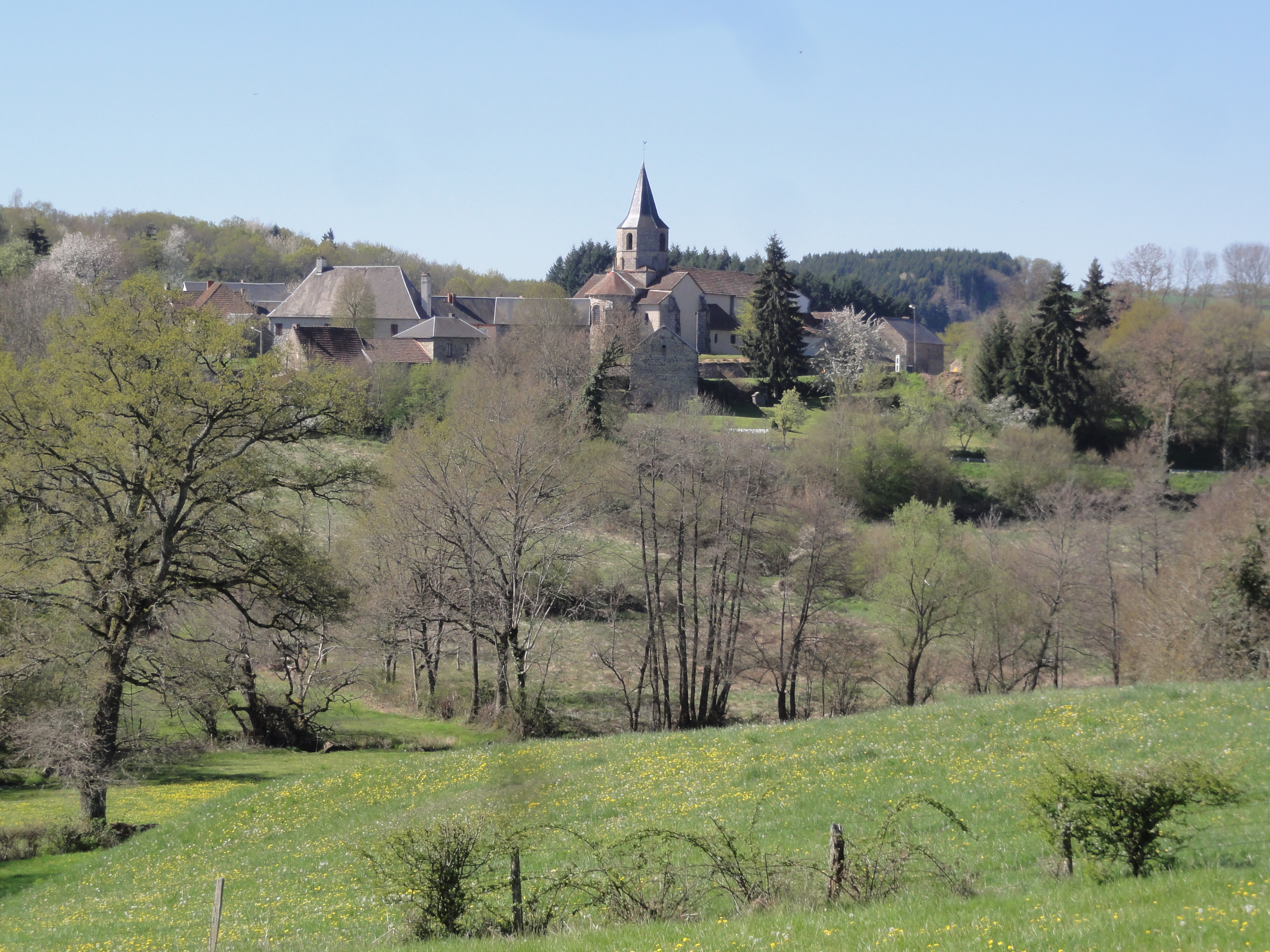
- A general view of Vergheas
- Location of Vergheas
- Location within France Location within Auvergne-Rhône-Alpes
- Coordinates: 46°01′50″N 2°36′57″E
- Country: France
- Region: Auvergne-Rhône-Alpes
- Department: Puy-de-Dôme
- Arrondissement: Riom
- Canton: Saint-Éloy-les-Mines
- Intercommunality: CC Pays de Saint-Éloy

Government
  - Mayor (2026–32): Gilles Bernard
- Area^{1}: 7.45 km^{2} (2.88 sq mi)
- Elevation: 602 m (1,975 ft)
- Highest elevation: 720 m (2,360 ft)
- Lowest elevation: 545 m (1,788 ft)
- Population (2023): 65
  - Density: 8.7/km^{2} (23/sq mi)
- Time zone: UTC+01:00 (CET)
  - Summer (DST): UTC+02:00 (CEST)
- INSEE/Postal code: 63447 /63330
- ^{1} French Land Register data, which excludes lakes, ponds, glaciers > 1 km^{2} (0.386 sq mi or 247 acres) and river estuaries.

Vergheas is a commune in the Puy-de-Dôme department in Auvergne in central France.

== See also ==
- Communes of the Puy-de-Dôme department
