= Châteauneuf-les-Bains =

- Commune
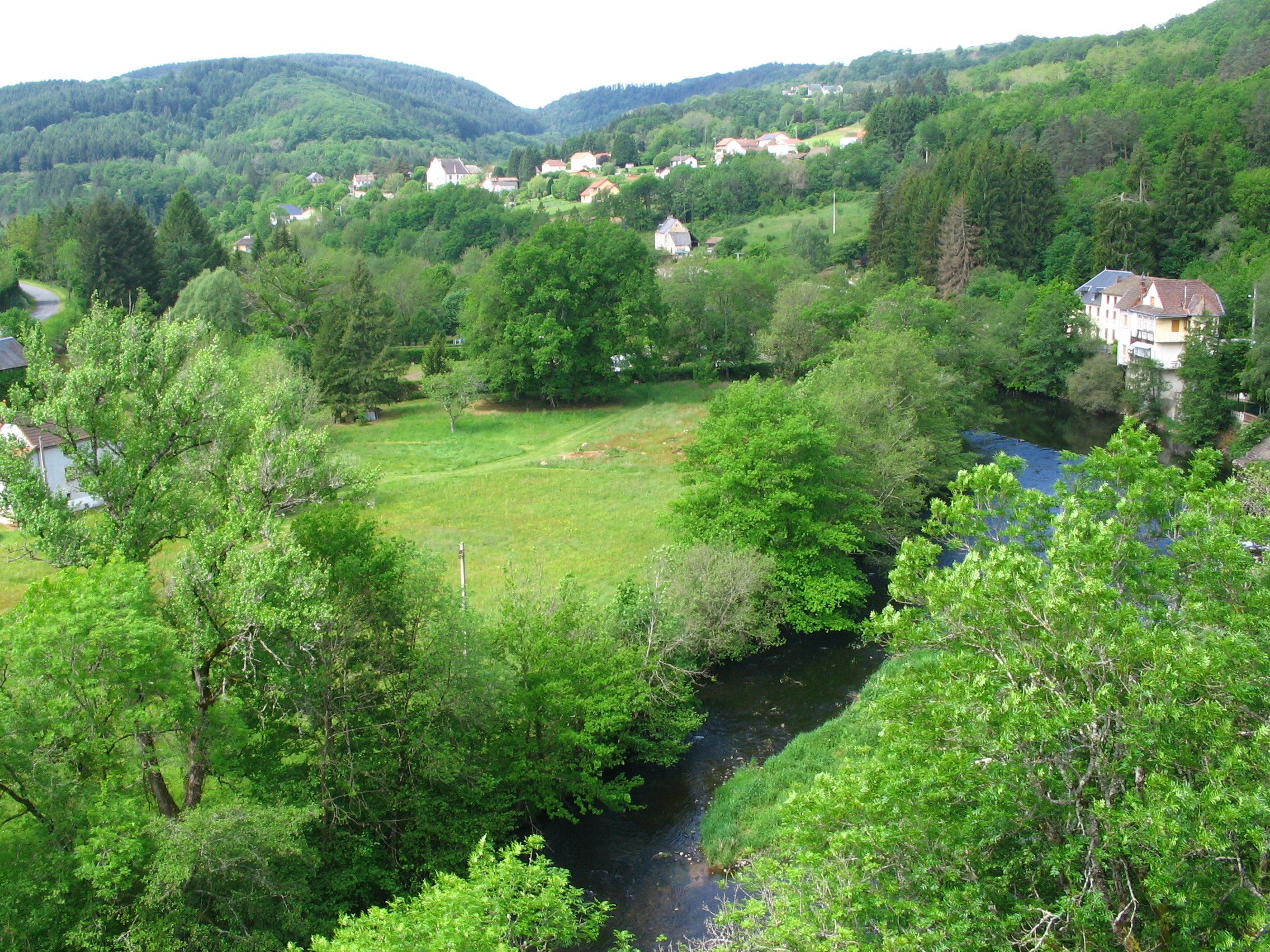
- A general view of Châteauneuf-les-Bains
- Location of Châteauneuf-les-Bains
- Location within France Location within Auvergne-Rhône-Alpes
- Coordinates: 46°01′45″N 2°53′50″E
- Country: France
- Region: Auvergne-Rhône-Alpes
- Department: Puy-de-Dôme
- Arrondissement: Riom
- Canton: Saint-Éloy-les-Mines
- Intercommunality: CC Combrailles Sioule et Morge

Government
  - Mayor (2020–2026): Jean-Yves Nouzille
- Area^{1}: 16.92 km^{2} (6.53 sq mi)
- Elevation: 380 m (1,250 ft)
- Highest elevation: 725 m (2,379 ft)
- Lowest elevation: 365 m (1,198 ft)
- Population (2023): 301
  - Density: 17.8/km^{2} (46.1/sq mi)
- Time zone: UTC+01:00 (CET)
  - Summer (DST): UTC+02:00 (CEST)
- INSEE/Postal code: 63100 /63390
- ^{1} French Land Register data, which excludes lakes, ponds, glaciers > 1 km^{2} (0.386 sq mi or 247 acres) and river estuaries.

Châteauneuf-les-Bains (French pronunciation: [ʃɑtonœf le bɛ̃]) is a commune in the Puy-de-Dôme department in Auvergne-Rhône-Alpes in central France. It is part of the canton of Saint-Éloy-les-Mines and the communauté de communes Combrailles Sioule et Morge.

== See also ==
- Communes of the Puy-de-Dôme department
