= Le Quartier =

- Commune
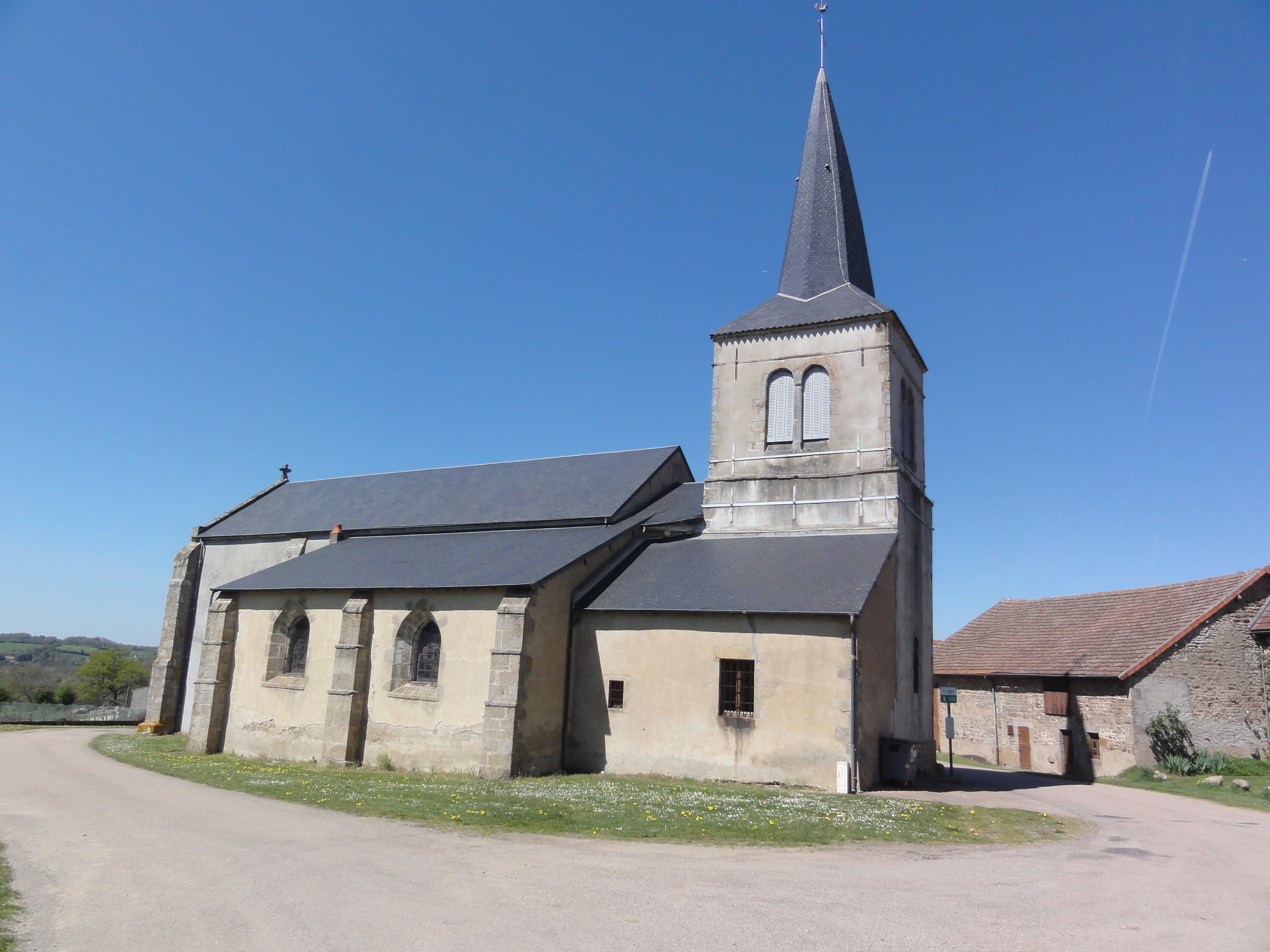
- The church in Le Quartier
- Location of Le Quartier
- Location within France Location within Auvergne-Rhône-Alpes
- Coordinates: 46°07′23″N 2°45′50″E
- Country: France
- Region: Auvergne-Rhône-Alpes
- Department: Puy-de-Dôme
- Arrondissement: Riom
- Canton: Saint-Éloy-les-Mines
- Intercommunality: CC Pays de Saint-Éloy

Government
  - Mayor (2026–32): Annelyse Duron
- Area^{1}: 23.37 km^{2} (9.02 sq mi)
- Elevation: 660 m (2,170 ft)
- Highest elevation: 767 m (2,516 ft)
- Lowest elevation: 534 m (1,752 ft)
- Population (2023): 225
  - Density: 9.63/km^{2} (24.9/sq mi)
- Time zone: UTC+01:00 (CET)
  - Summer (DST): UTC+02:00 (CEST)
- INSEE/Postal code: 63293 /63330
- ^{1} French Land Register data, which excludes lakes, ponds, glaciers > 1 km^{2} (0.386 sq mi or 247 acres) and river estuaries.

Le Quartier (French pronunciation: [lə kaʁtje]) is a commune in the Puy-de-Dôme department in Auvergne in central France.

== See also ==
- Communes of the Puy-de-Dôme department
