= Château-sur-Cher =

- Commune
- Location of Château-sur-Cher
- Location within France Location within Auvergne-Rhône-Alpes
- Coordinates: 46°07′05″N 2°33′21″E
- Country: France
- Region: Auvergne-Rhône-Alpes
- Department: Puy-de-Dôme
- Arrondissement: Riom
- Canton: Saint-Éloy-les-Mines
- Intercommunality: CC Pays de Saint-Éloy

Government
  - Mayor (2020–2026): Robert Dubuis
- Area^{1}: 11.87 km^{2} (4.58 sq mi)
- Elevation: 504 m (1,654 ft)
- Highest elevation: 593 m (1,946 ft)
- Lowest elevation: 359 m (1,178 ft)
- Population (2023): 71
  - Density: 6.0/km^{2} (15/sq mi)
- Time zone: UTC+01:00 (CET)
  - Summer (DST): UTC+02:00 (CEST)
- INSEE/Postal code: 63101 /63330
- ^{1} French Land Register data, which excludes lakes, ponds, glaciers > 1 km^{2} (0.386 sq mi or 247 acres) and river estuaries.

Château-sur-Cher (French pronunciation: [ʃato syʁ ʃɛʁ]; Auvergnat: Lo Chastèl de Char) is a commune in the Puy-de-Dôme department in Auvergne-Rhône-Alpes in central France.

== See also ==
- Communes of the Puy-de-Dôme department
