= Ars-les-Favets =

- Commune
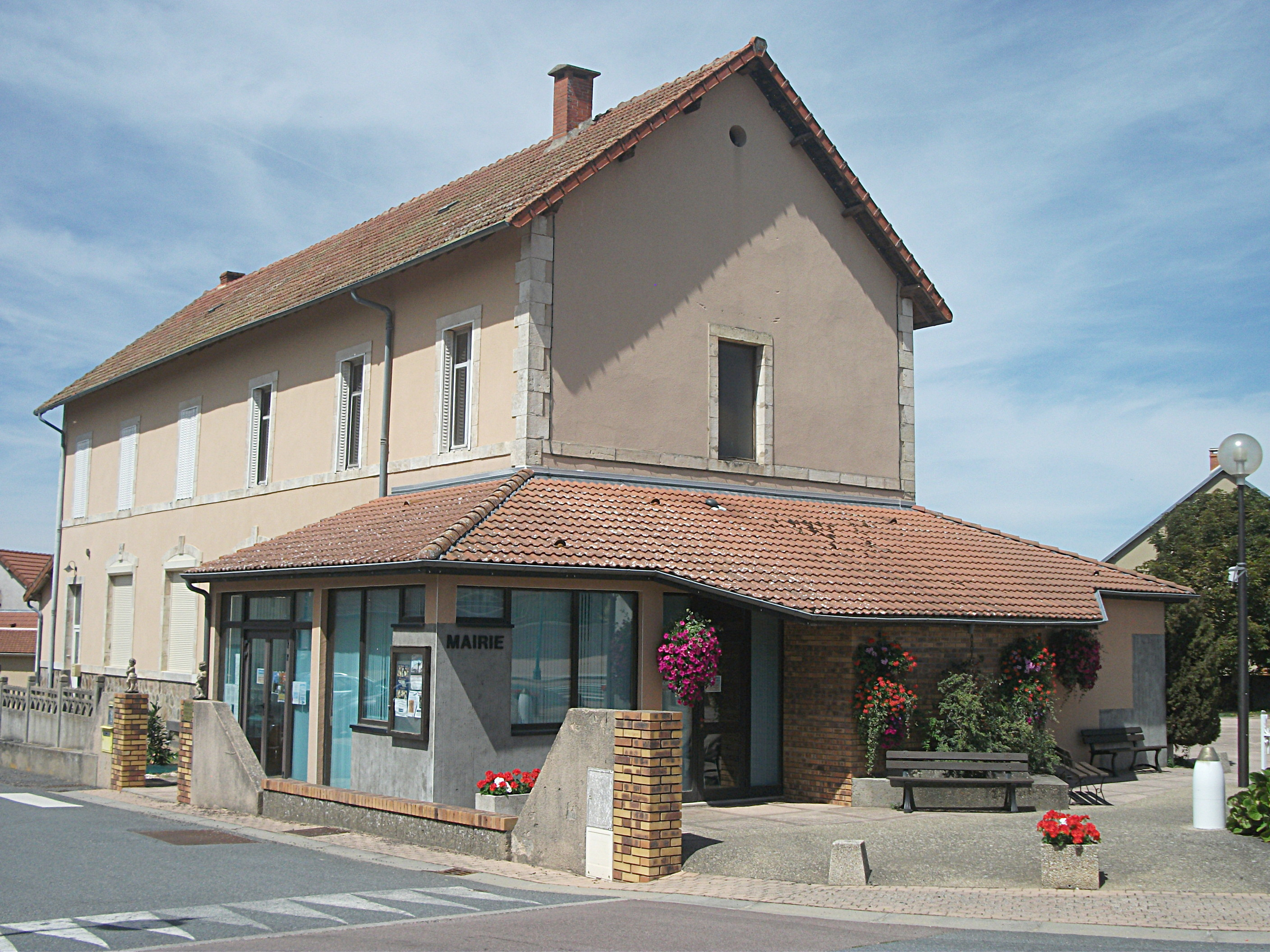
- Town hall

- Coat of arms
- Location of Ars-les-Favets
- Location within France Location within Auvergne-Rhône-Alpes
- Coordinates: 46°11′40″N 2°45′22″E
- Country: France
- Region: Auvergne-Rhône-Alpes
- Department: Puy-de-Dôme
- Arrondissement: Riom
- Canton: Saint-Éloy-les-Mines
- Intercommunality: CC du Pays de Saint-Éloy

Government
  - Mayor (2026–32): Marie Tardivat
- Area^{1}: 14.6 km^{2} (5.6 sq mi)
- Elevation: 600 m (2,000 ft)
- Highest elevation: 597 m (1,959 ft)
- Lowest elevation: 486 m (1,594 ft)
- Population (2023): 220
  - Density: 15/km^{2} (39/sq mi)
- Time zone: UTC+01:00 (CET)
  - Summer (DST): UTC+02:00 (CEST)
- INSEE/Postal code: 63011 /63700
- ^{1} French Land Register data, which excludes lakes, ponds, glaciers > 1 km^{2} (0.386 sq mi or 247 acres) and river estuaries.

Ars-les-Favets (Auvergnat: Ars daus Favets) is a commune in the Puy-de-Dôme department in Auvergne-Rhône-Alpes in central France.

== Population ==
Historical population
| Year | Pop. | ±% p.a. |
|---|---|---|
| 1968 | 322 | — |
| 1975 | 283 | −1.83% |
| 1982 | 247 | −1.92% |
| 1990 | 214 | −1.78% |
| 1999 | 218 | +0.21% |
| 2007 | 236 | +1.00% |
| 2012 | 233 | −0.26% |
| 2017 | 225 | −0.70% |
| 2023 | 220 | −0.37% |
Source: INSEE

== See also ==
- Communes of the Puy-de-Dôme department
