= Antoine Villedieu (20th-century politician) =

French politician

Antoine Villedieu (French pronunciation: [ɑ̃twan vildjø]; 9 December 1887 – 17 July 1947) was a French politician.

Villedieu was born in Biollet. He represented the French Section of the Workers' International (SFIO) in the Chamber of Deputies from 1935 to 1940. On 10 July 1940 he voted in favour of granting the Cabinet presided by Marshal Philippe Pétain authority to draw up a new constitution, thereby effectively ending the French Third Republic.
