= Durmignat =

- Commune
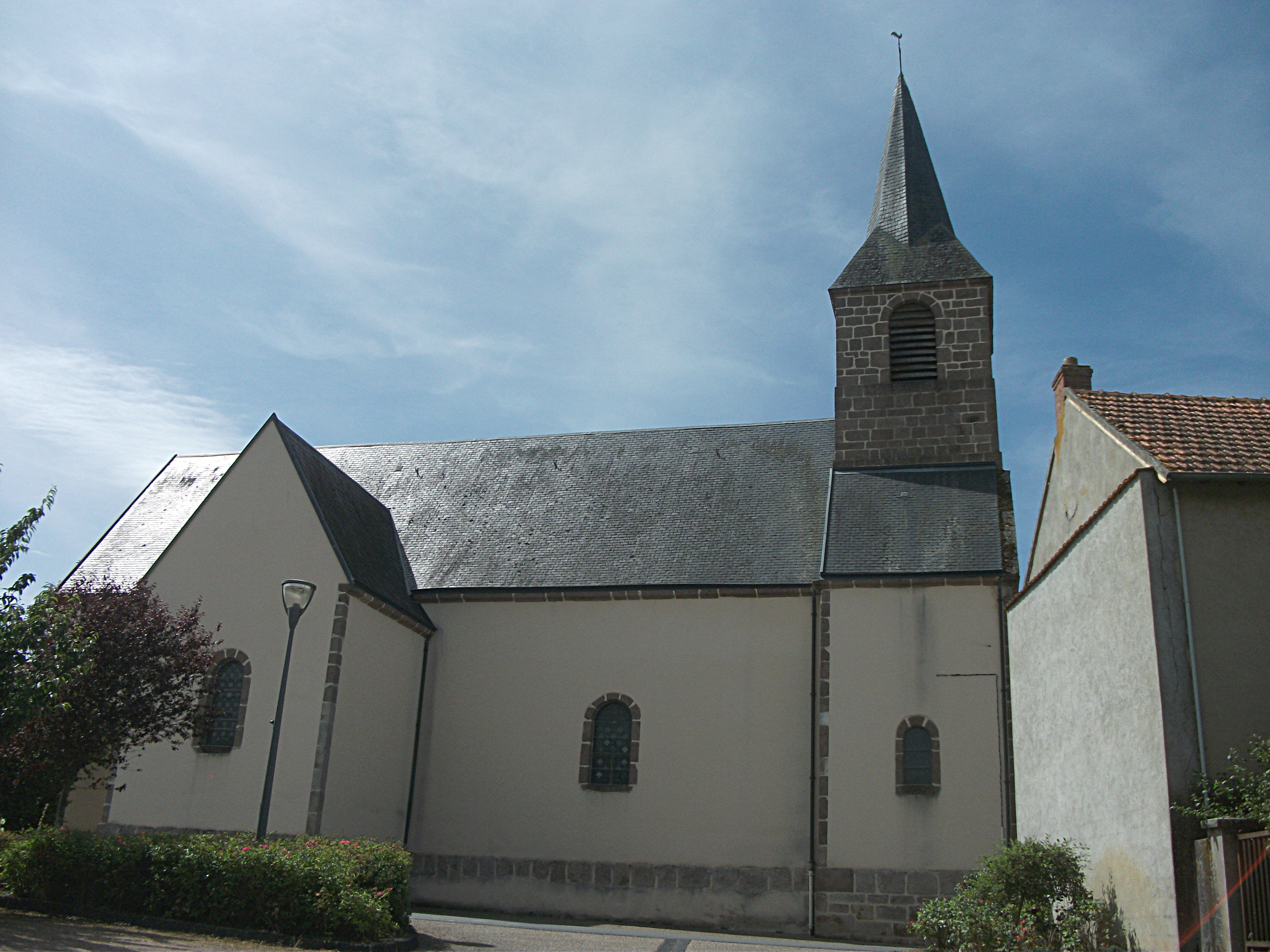
- The church

- Coat of arms
- Location of Durmignat
- Location within France Location within Auvergne-Rhône-Alpes
- Coordinates: 46°11′14″N 2°53′24″E
- Country: France
- Region: Auvergne-Rhône-Alpes
- Department: Puy-de-Dôme
- Arrondissement: Riom
- Canton: Saint-Éloy-les-Mines
- Intercommunality: CC Pays de Saint-Éloy

Government
  - Mayor (2026–32): Guy Chartoire
- Area^{1}: 12.36 km^{2} (4.77 sq mi)
- Elevation: 500 m (1,600 ft)
- Highest elevation: 567 m (1,860 ft)
- Lowest elevation: 408 m (1,339 ft)
- Population (2023): 214
  - Density: 17.3/km^{2} (44.8/sq mi)
- Time zone: UTC+01:00 (CET)
  - Summer (DST): UTC+02:00 (CEST)
- INSEE/Postal code: 63140 /63700
- ^{1} French Land Register data, which excludes lakes, ponds, glaciers > 1 km^{2} (0.386 sq mi or 247 acres) and river estuaries.

Durmignat (French pronunciation: [dyʁmiɲa]; Occitan: Durminhac) is a commune in the Puy-de-Dôme department in Auvergne in central France.

== Geography ==
The river Bouble flows northeastward through the commune and forms part of its north-eastern border.

== See also ==
- Communes of the Puy-de-Dôme department
