= Teilhet, Puy-de-Dôme =

Teilhet
- Commune
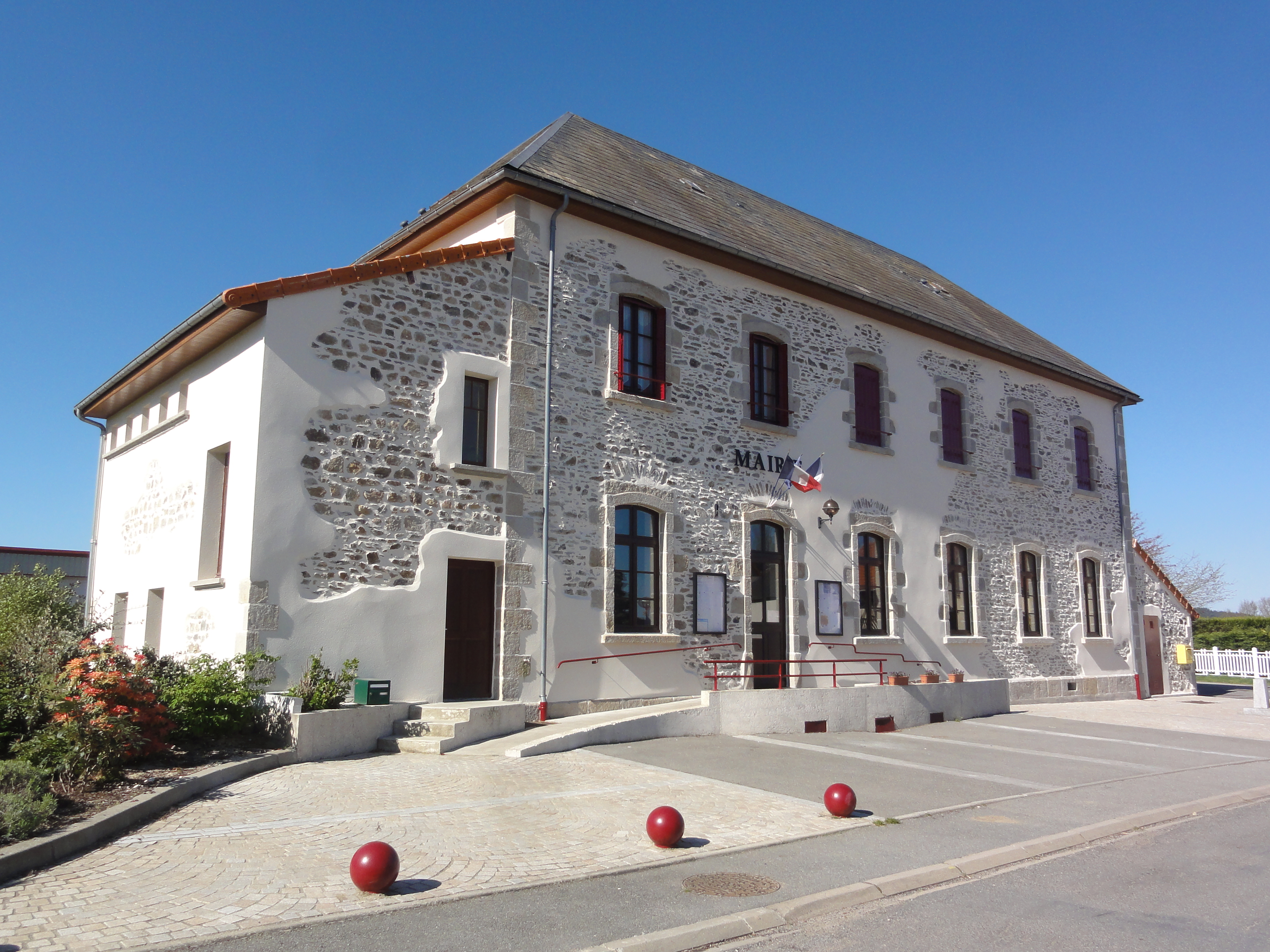
- The town hall in Teilhet
- Location of Teilhet
- Location within France Location within Auvergne-Rhône-Alpes
- Coordinates: 46°05′50″N 2°49′21″E
- Country: France
- Region: Auvergne-Rhône-Alpes
- Department: Puy-de-Dôme
- Arrondissement: Riom
- Canton: Saint-Éloy-les-Mines
- Intercommunality: CC Pays de Saint-Éloy

Government
  - Mayor (2026–32): Bernard Duverger
- Area^{1}: 18.81 km^{2} (7.26 sq mi)
- Elevation: 681 m (2,234 ft)
- Highest elevation: 747 m (2,451 ft)
- Lowest elevation: 520 m (1,710 ft)
- Population (2023): 286
  - Density: 15.2/km^{2} (39.4/sq mi)
- Time zone: UTC+01:00 (CET)
  - Summer (DST): UTC+02:00 (CEST)
- INSEE/Postal code: 63428 /63560
- ^{1} French Land Register data, which excludes lakes, ponds, glaciers > 1 km^{2} (0.386 sq mi or 247 acres) and river estuaries.

Teilhet (French pronunciation: [tɛjɛ]; Occitan: Telhet) is a commune in the Puy-de-Dôme department in Auvergne in central France.

== Geography ==
The Bouble flows north-northeastward through the western part of the commune.

== See also ==
- Communes of the Puy-de-Dôme department
