= La Bussière =

La Bussière may refer to the following communes in France:

- La Bussière, Loiret, in the Loiret department
- La Bussière, Vienne, in the Vienne department

== See also ==
- Bussière (disambiguation)
- Bussières (disambiguation)
