= Canton of Saint-Éloy-les-Mines =

Coordinates: 46.16°N 2.83°E

The canton of Saint-Éloy-les-Mines is an administrative division of the Puy-de-Dôme department, central France. It was created at the French canton reorganisation which came into effect in March 2015. Its seat is in Saint-Éloy-les-Mines.

It consists of the following communes:

1. Ars-les-Favets
2. Ayat-sur-Sioule
3. Biollet
4. Bussières
5. Buxières-sous-Montaigut
6. La Cellette
7. Charensat
8. Châteauneuf-les-Bains
9. Château-sur-Cher
10. La Crouzille
11. Durmignat
12. Espinasse
13. Gouttières
14. Lapeyrouse
15. Menat
16. Montaigut
17. Moureuille
18. Neuf-Église
19. Pionsat
20. Le Quartier
21. Roche-d'Agoux
22. Sainte-Christine
23. Saint-Éloy-les-Mines
24. Saint-Gervais-d'Auvergne
25. Saint-Hilaire
26. Saint-Julien-la-Geneste
27. Saint-Maigner
28. Saint-Maurice-près-Pionsat
29. Saint-Priest-des-Champs
30. Sauret-Besserve
31. Servant
32. Teilhet
33. Vergheas
34. Virlet
35. Youx
