= La Crouzille =

- Commune
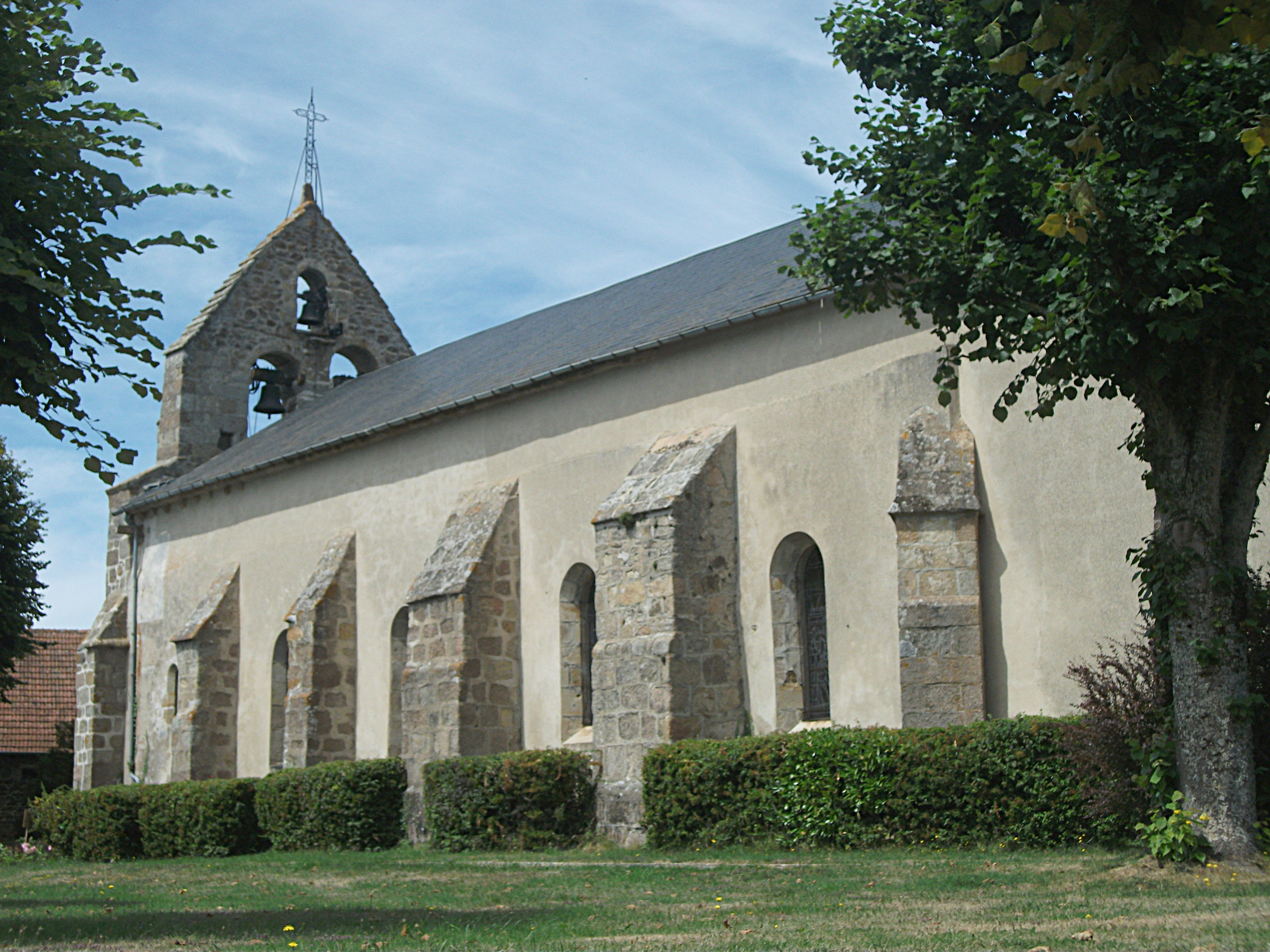
- Church

- Coat of arms
- Location of La Crouzille
- Location within France Location within Auvergne-Rhône-Alpes
- Coordinates: 46°10′54″N 2°44′45″E
- Country: France
- Region: Auvergne-Rhône-Alpes
- Department: Puy-de-Dôme
- Arrondissement: Riom
- Canton: Saint-Éloy-les-Mines
- Intercommunality: CC Pays de Saint-Éloy

Government
  - Mayor (2026–32): Michèle Meunier
- Area^{1}: 18.6 km^{2} (7.2 sq mi)
- Elevation: 610 m (2,000 ft)
- Highest elevation: 663 m (2,175 ft)
- Lowest elevation: 491 m (1,611 ft)
- Population (2023): 262
  - Density: 14.1/km^{2} (36.5/sq mi)
- Time zone: UTC+01:00 (CET)
  - Summer (DST): UTC+02:00 (CEST)
- INSEE/Postal code: 63130 /63700
- ^{1} French Land Register data, which excludes lakes, ponds, glaciers > 1 km^{2} (0.386 sq mi or 247 acres) and river estuaries.

La Crouzille (French pronunciation: [la kʁuzij]; Occitan: La Crosilha) is a commune in the Puy-de-Dôme department of Auvergne-Rhône-Alpes, in central France.

== See also ==
- Communes of the Puy-de-Dôme department
