= Saint-Maigner =

- Commune
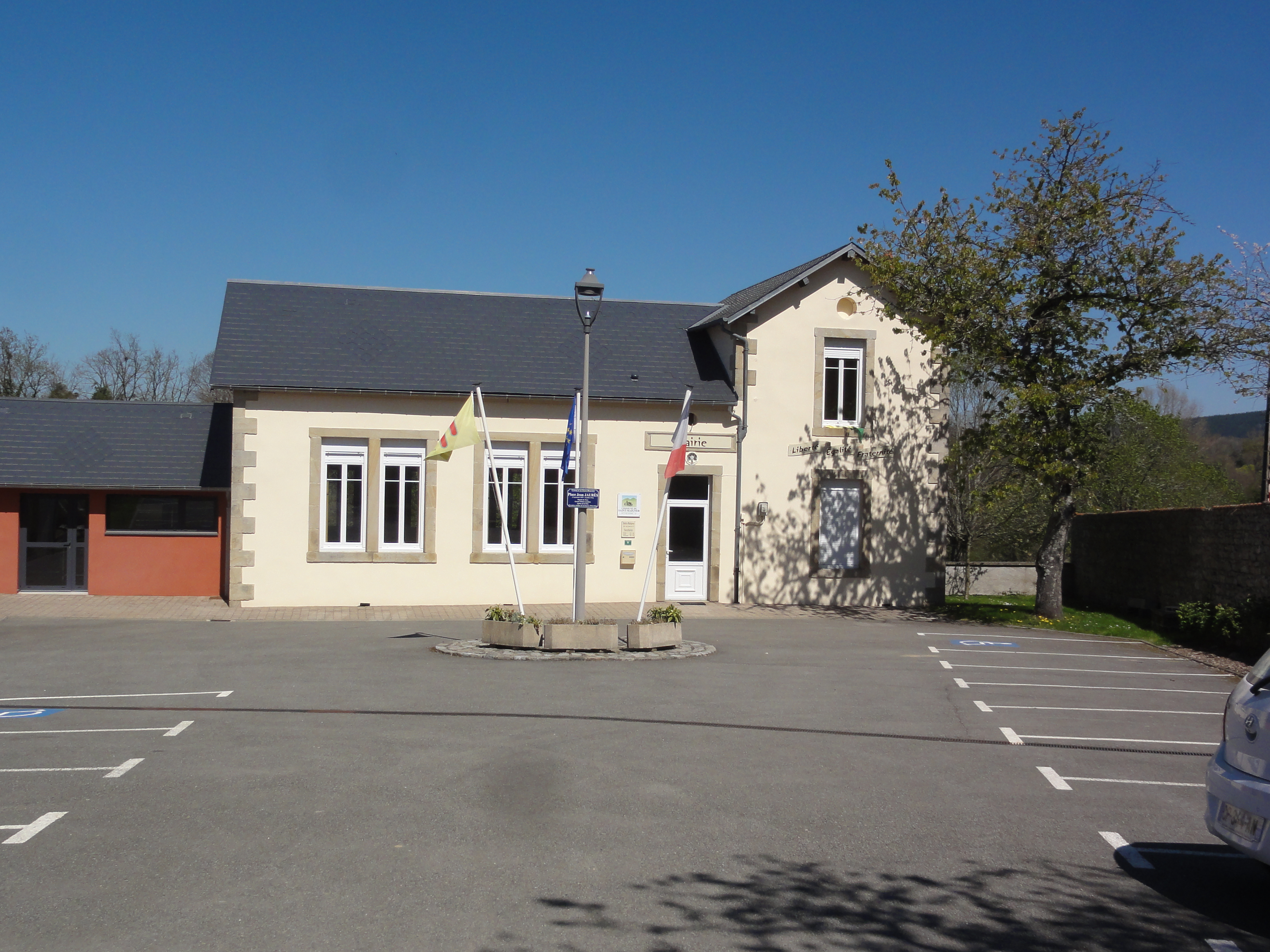
- The town hall in Saint-Maigner
- Location of Saint-Maigner
- Location within France Location within Auvergne-Rhône-Alpes
- Coordinates: 46°05′17″N 2°41′10″E
- Country: France
- Region: Auvergne-Rhône-Alpes
- Department: Puy-de-Dôme
- Arrondissement: Riom
- Canton: Saint-Éloy-les-Mines
- Intercommunality: CC Pays de Saint-Éloy

Government
  - Mayor (2026–32): Laurent Dumas
- Area^{1}: 18.97 km^{2} (7.32 sq mi)
- Elevation: 620 m (2,030 ft)
- Highest elevation: 789 m (2,589 ft)
- Lowest elevation: 512 m (1,680 ft)
- Population (2023): 162
  - Density: 8.54/km^{2} (22.1/sq mi)
- Time zone: UTC+01:00 (CET)
  - Summer (DST): UTC+02:00 (CEST)
- INSEE/Postal code: 63373 /63330
- ^{1} French Land Register data, which excludes lakes, ponds, glaciers > 1 km^{2} (0.386 sq mi or 247 acres) and river estuaries.

Saint-Maigner (French pronunciation: [sɛ̃ mɛɲe]; Occitan: Sent Manher) is a commune in the Puy-de-Dôme department in Auvergne in central France.

== See also ==
- Communes of the Puy-de-Dôme department
