= Saint-Hilaire, Puy-de-Dôme =

Saint-Hilaire
- Commune
- Coat of arms
- Location of Saint-Hilaire
- Location within France Location within Auvergne-Rhône-Alpes
- Coordinates: 46°06′22″N 2°37′55″E
- Country: France
- Region: Auvergne-Rhône-Alpes
- Department: Puy-de-Dôme
- Arrondissement: Riom
- Canton: Saint-Éloy-les-Mines
- Intercommunality: CC Pays de Saint-Éloy

Government
  - Mayor (2026–32): Denis Astruc
- Area^{1}: 17.63 km^{2} (6.81 sq mi)
- Elevation: 565 m (1,854 ft)
- Highest elevation: 596 m (1,955 ft)
- Lowest elevation: 406 m (1,332 ft)
- Population (2023): 144
  - Density: 8.17/km^{2} (21.2/sq mi)
- Time zone: UTC+01:00 (CET)
  - Summer (DST): UTC+02:00 (CEST)
- INSEE/Postal code: 63360 /63330
- ^{1} French Land Register data, which excludes lakes, ponds, glaciers > 1 km^{2} (0.386 sq mi or 247 acres) and river estuaries.

Saint-Hilaire (French pronunciation: [sɛ̃.t‿ilɛʁ]) is a commune in the Puy-de-Dôme department in Auvergne in central France.

== See also ==
- Communes of the Puy-de-Dôme department
