= Virlet =

- Commune
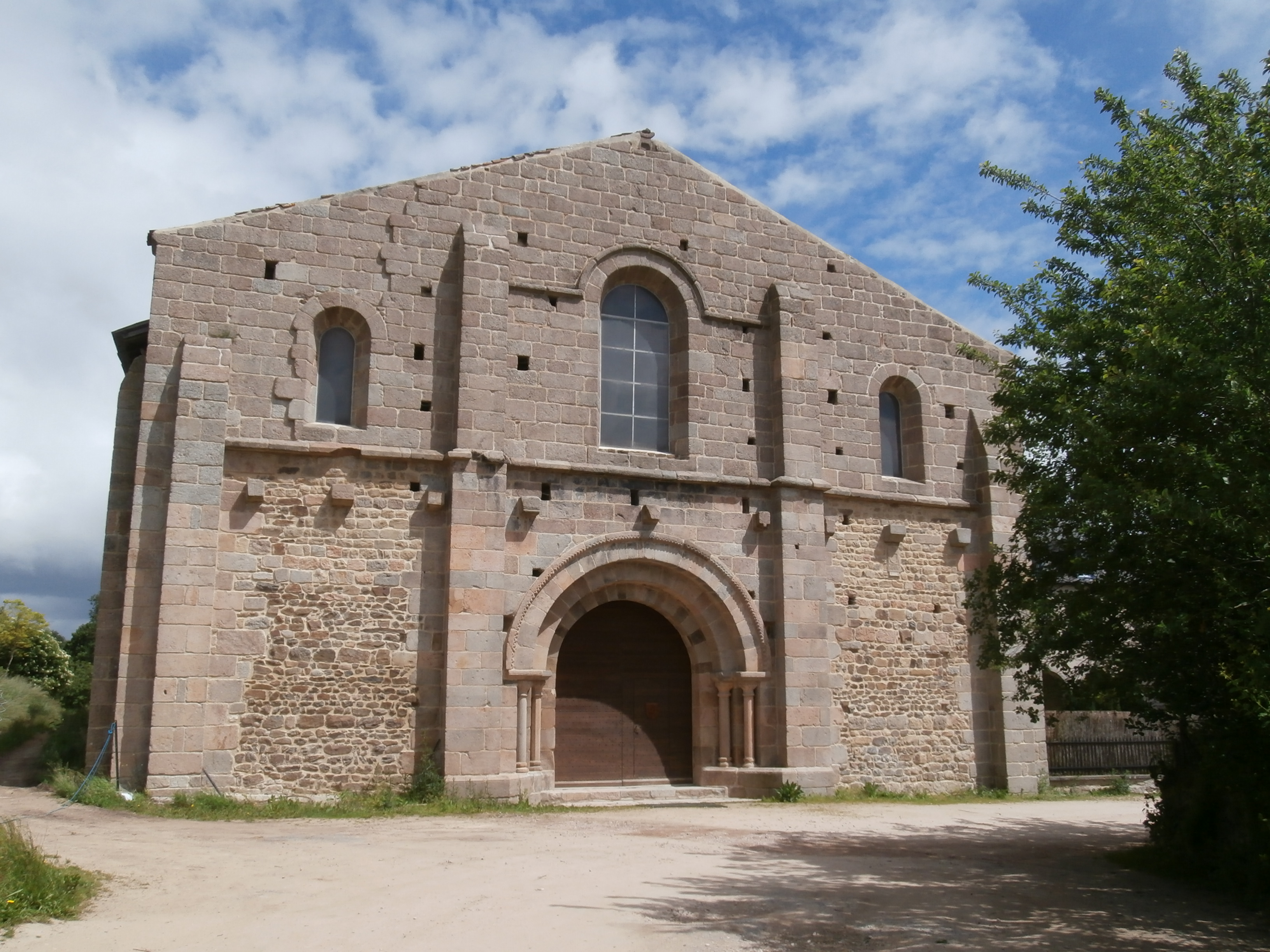
- The abbey church in Virlet

- Coat of arms
- Location of Virlet
- Location within France Location within Auvergne-Rhône-Alpes
- Coordinates: 46°09′21″N 2°41′56″E
- Country: France
- Region: Auvergne-Rhône-Alpes
- Department: Puy-de-Dôme
- Arrondissement: Riom
- Canton: Saint-Éloy-les-Mines
- Intercommunality: CC Pays de Saint-Éloy

Government
  - Mayor (2020–2026): Marc Beaumont
- Area^{1}: 17.37 km^{2} (6.71 sq mi)
- Elevation: 530 m (1,740 ft)
- Highest elevation: 633 m (2,077 ft)
- Lowest elevation: 460 m (1,510 ft)
- Population (2023): 270
  - Density: 16/km^{2} (40/sq mi)
- Time zone: UTC+01:00 (CET)
  - Summer (DST): UTC+02:00 (CEST)
- INSEE/Postal code: 63462 /63330
- ^{1} French Land Register data, which excludes lakes, ponds, glaciers > 1 km^{2} (0.386 sq mi or 247 acres) and river estuaries.

Virlet (French pronunciation: [viʁlɛ]) is a commune in the Puy-de-Dôme department in Auvergne in central France.

== See also ==
- Communes of the Puy-de-Dôme department
