= Youx =

- Commune
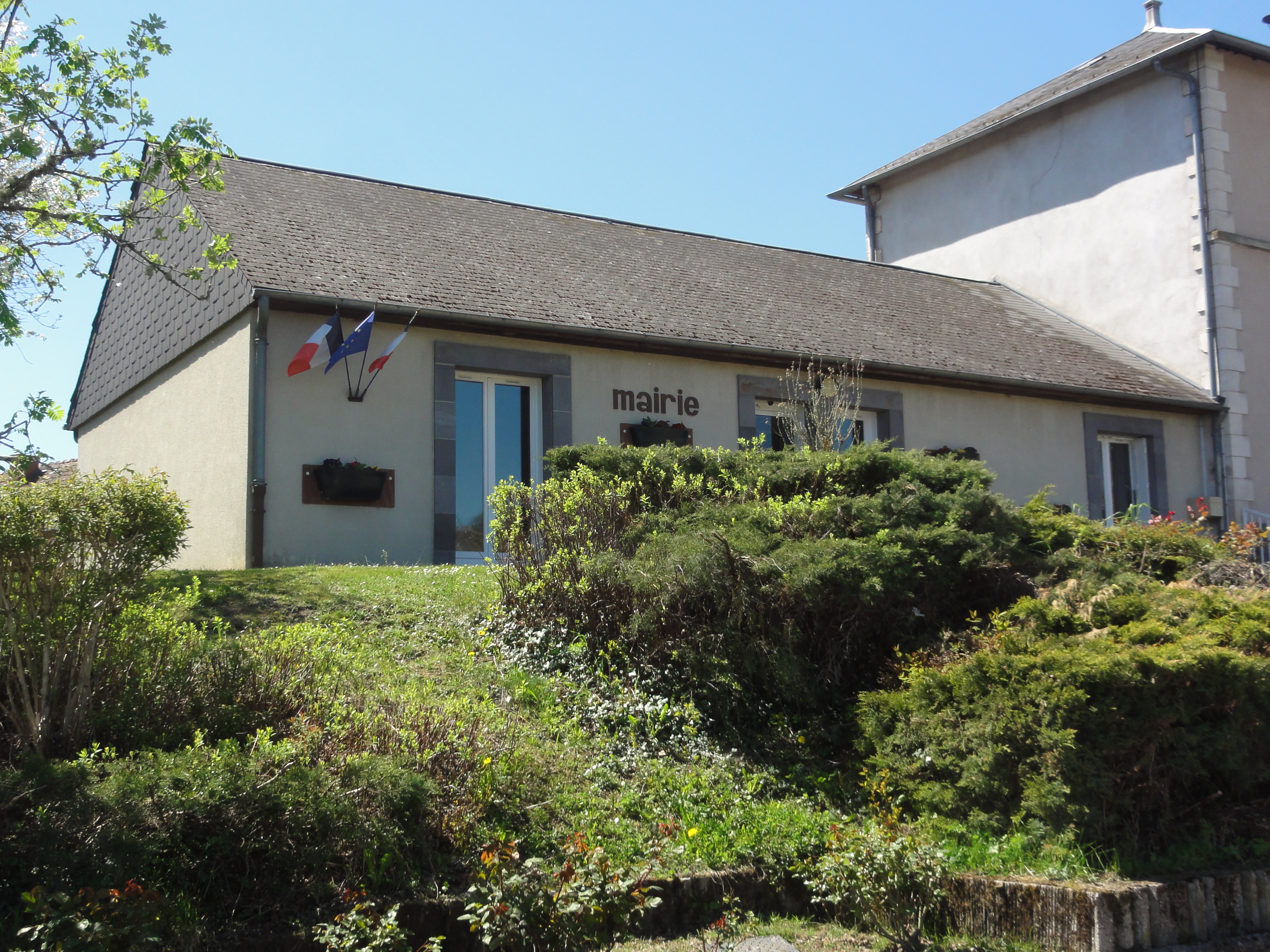
- The town hall in Youx

- Coat of arms
- Location of Youx
- Location within France Location within Auvergne-Rhône-Alpes
- Coordinates: 46°08′42″N 2°47′56″E
- Country: France
- Region: Auvergne-Rhône-Alpes
- Department: Puy-de-Dôme
- Arrondissement: Riom
- Canton: Saint-Éloy-les-Mines
- Intercommunality: Pays de Saint-Éloy

Government
  - Mayor (2026–32): Jean-Jacques Grzybowski
- Area^{1}: 19.13 km^{2} (7.39 sq mi)
- Elevation: 570 m (1,870 ft)
- Highest elevation: 743 m (2,438 ft)
- Lowest elevation: 495 m (1,624 ft)
- Population (2023): 864
  - Density: 45.2/km^{2} (117/sq mi)
- Time zone: UTC+01:00 (CET)
  - Summer (DST): UTC+02:00 (CEST)
- INSEE/Postal code: 63471 /63700
- ^{1} French Land Register data, which excludes lakes, ponds, glaciers > 1 km^{2} (0.386 sq mi or 247 acres) and river estuaries.

Youx is a commune in the Puy-de-Dôme department in Auvergne-Rhône-Alpes in central France.

== Geography ==
The river Bouble flows north-northeastward through the eastern part of the commune.

== Population ==
Historical population
Year	Pop.	±% p.a.
1968	1,747	—
1975	1,512	−2.04%
1982	1,297	−2.17%
1990	1,115	−1.87%
1999	1,002	−1.18%
2007	1,011	+0.11%
2012	975	−0.72%
2017	915	−1.26%
2023	864	−0.95%
Source: INSEE

== See also ==
- Communes of the Puy-de-Dôme department
