= Gouttières, Puy-de-Dôme =

Gouttières
- Commune
- Coat of arms
- Location of Gouttières
- Location within France Location within Auvergne-Rhône-Alpes
- Coordinates: 46°03′47″N 2°46′12″E
- Country: France
- Region: Auvergne-Rhône-Alpes
- Department: Puy-de-Dôme
- Arrondissement: Riom
- Canton: Saint-Éloy-les-Mines
- Intercommunality: CC Pays de Saint-Éloy

Government
  - Mayor (2026–32): Jean-Marc Pujol
- Area^{1}: 25.63 km^{2} (9.90 sq mi)
- Elevation: 660 m (2,170 ft)
- Highest elevation: 803 m (2,635 ft)
- Lowest elevation: 591 m (1,939 ft)
- Population (2023): 298
  - Density: 11.6/km^{2} (30.1/sq mi)
- Time zone: UTC+01:00 (CET)
  - Summer (DST): UTC+02:00 (CEST)
- INSEE/Postal code: 63171 /63390
- ^{1} French Land Register data, which excludes lakes, ponds, glaciers > 1 km^{2} (0.386 sq mi or 247 acres) and river estuaries.

Gouttières (French pronunciation: [ɡutjɛʁ]; Occitan: Gotièra) is a commune in the Puy-de-Dôme department in Auvergne-Rhône-Alpes in central France.

It is located in the Combrailles part of the Auvergne région, in the canton of Saint-Éloy-les-Mines.

Its name finds its roots in the five small water streams that unite here to later join the Sioule River. Gouttières is around 100 km^{2} (39 sq mi) big and situated between 600–700 meters above sea level

The area is rural with a high conservation of wildlife and biodiversity. There is a coverage of about 30% woods and some cereal cultivation and the breeding of Charolais cattle.

== Economy ==
Most inhabitants grow their own vegetables, they have often chicken and raise rabbits and some raise their own pigs. Old fashioned farmer life slowly makes place for bigger exploitations and little by little young inhabitants are leaving or involved in other activities. Rockwool, Michelin or a Steel factory are the options to find jobs in the industry although this type of work seems to be diminishing. Some work in the service economy or even some culture activities arise, such as pottery making or art. Also tourism develops. French, English and many Dutch, have bought small houses or old barns to turn them into their holiday homes.

== Tourism and culture ==
The French and European funding helped to bring more gites and other tourist attractions to the area.

The village is known in all the département of Puy-de-Dôme for the pottery of 'la Batisse' that creates utilitarian and creative ceramic works. You can take classes in pottery or be trained on a professional artisan level.

The Dutch artist Wouter Verrips also contributes to the cultural life teaching art classes and summer courses as well exploiting a painting sculpture and printmaking studio.

The village high time is the last weekend of April when all work together to organise the pottery market of Gouttières. A nationwide selection of pottery makers and ceramists present their work and the event brings over 10.000 visitors to the village.

== Geography ==
The commune is located 35 km (22 mi) southeast of Montluçon and 40 km (25 mi) northwest of Clermont-Ferrand.

The Bouble has its source in the northern part of the commune.

== See also ==
- Communes of the Puy-de-Dôme department
