= Neuf-Église =

- Commune
- Location of Neuf-Église
- Location within France Location within Auvergne-Rhône-Alpes
- Coordinates: 46°05′49″N 2°53′24″E
- Country: France
- Region: Auvergne-Rhône-Alpes
- Department: Puy-de-Dôme
- Arrondissement: Riom
- Canton: Saint-Éloy-les-Mines
- Intercommunality: CC Pays de Saint-Éloy

Government
  - Mayor (2026–32): Karine Bournat-Gonzalez
- Area^{1}: 14.94 km^{2} (5.77 sq mi)
- Elevation: 564 m (1,850 ft)
- Highest elevation: 691 m (2,267 ft)
- Lowest elevation: 440 m (1,440 ft)
- Population (2023): 332
  - Density: 22.2/km^{2} (57.6/sq mi)
- Time zone: UTC+01:00 (CET)
  - Summer (DST): UTC+02:00 (CEST)
- INSEE/Postal code: 63251 /63560
- ^{1} French Land Register data, which excludes lakes, ponds, glaciers > 1 km^{2} (0.386 sq mi or 247 acres) and river estuaries.

Neuf-Église (French pronunciation: [nœf eɡliz]) is a commune in the Puy-de-Dôme department in Auvergne in central France.

== See also ==
- Communes of the Puy-de-Dôme department
