= Sainte-Christine, Puy-de-Dôme =

Sainte-Christine
- Commune
- Coat of arms
- Location of Sainte-Christine
- Location within France Location within Auvergne-Rhône-Alpes
- Coordinates: 46°04′01″N 2°50′06″E
- Country: France
- Region: Auvergne-Rhône-Alpes
- Department: Puy-de-Dôme
- Arrondissement: Riom
- Canton: Saint-Éloy-les-Mines
- Intercommunality: CC Pays de Saint-Éloy

Government
  - Mayor (2026–32): Jacques Thomas
- Area^{1}: 12.78 km^{2} (4.93 sq mi)
- Elevation: 700 m (2,300 ft)
- Highest elevation: 724 m (2,375 ft)
- Lowest elevation: 520 m (1,710 ft)
- Population (2023): 122
  - Density: 9.55/km^{2} (24.7/sq mi)
- Time zone: UTC+01:00 (CET)
  - Summer (DST): UTC+02:00 (CEST)
- INSEE/Postal code: 63329 /63390
- ^{1} French Land Register data, which excludes lakes, ponds, glaciers > 1 km^{2} (0.386 sq mi or 247 acres) and river estuaries.

Sainte-Christine (French pronunciation: [sɛ̃t kʁistin]; Auvergnat: Santa Cristina) is a commune in the Puy-de-Dôme department in Auvergne in central France.

== See also ==
- Communes of the Puy-de-Dôme department
