= Bussière =

Bussière is a surname. Notable people with the name include:

- Franck Bussière (born 1975), French rower
- Gaston Bussière (1862–1928/29), French painter and illustrator
- Théo Bussière (born 1995), French swimmer
- Thomas A. Bussiere (born 1963), American lieutenant general

== See also ==
- Bussières
