= Moureuille =

- Commune
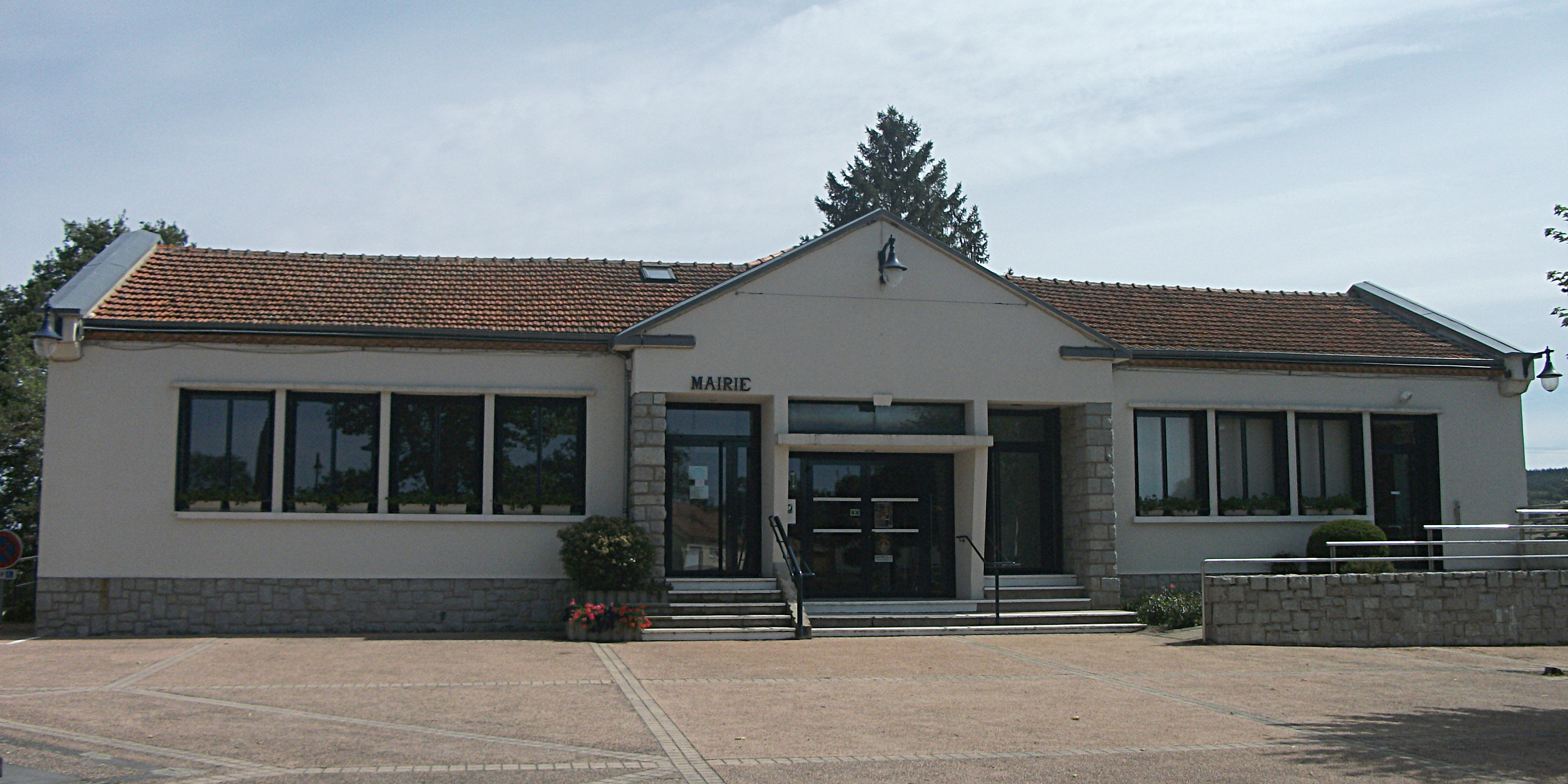
- Moureuille Town hall
- Location of Moureuille
- Location within France Location within Auvergne-Rhône-Alpes
- Coordinates: 46°10′01″N 2°54′25″E
- Country: France
- Region: Auvergne-Rhône-Alpes
- Department: Puy-de-Dôme
- Arrondissement: Riom
- Canton: Saint-Éloy-les-Mines
- Intercommunality: CC Pays de Saint-Éloy

Government
  - Mayor (2026–32): Didier Bournat
- Area^{1}: 16.83 km^{2} (6.50 sq mi)
- Elevation: 580 m (1,900 ft)
- Highest elevation: 625 m (2,051 ft)
- Lowest elevation: 454 m (1,490 ft)
- Population (2023): 371
  - Density: 22.0/km^{2} (57.1/sq mi)
- Time zone: UTC+01:00 (CET)
  - Summer (DST): UTC+02:00 (CEST)
- INSEE/Postal code: 63243 /63700
- ^{1} French Land Register data, which excludes lakes, ponds, glaciers > 1 km^{2} (0.386 sq mi or 247 acres) and river estuaries.

Moureuille (French pronunciation: [muʁœj]; Occitan: Morelh) is a commune in the Puy-de-Dôme department in Auvergne in central France.

== Geography ==
The river Bouble forms part of the commune's north-western border.

== See also ==
- Communes of the Puy-de-Dôme department
