= Servant, Puy-de-Dôme =

Servant
- Commune
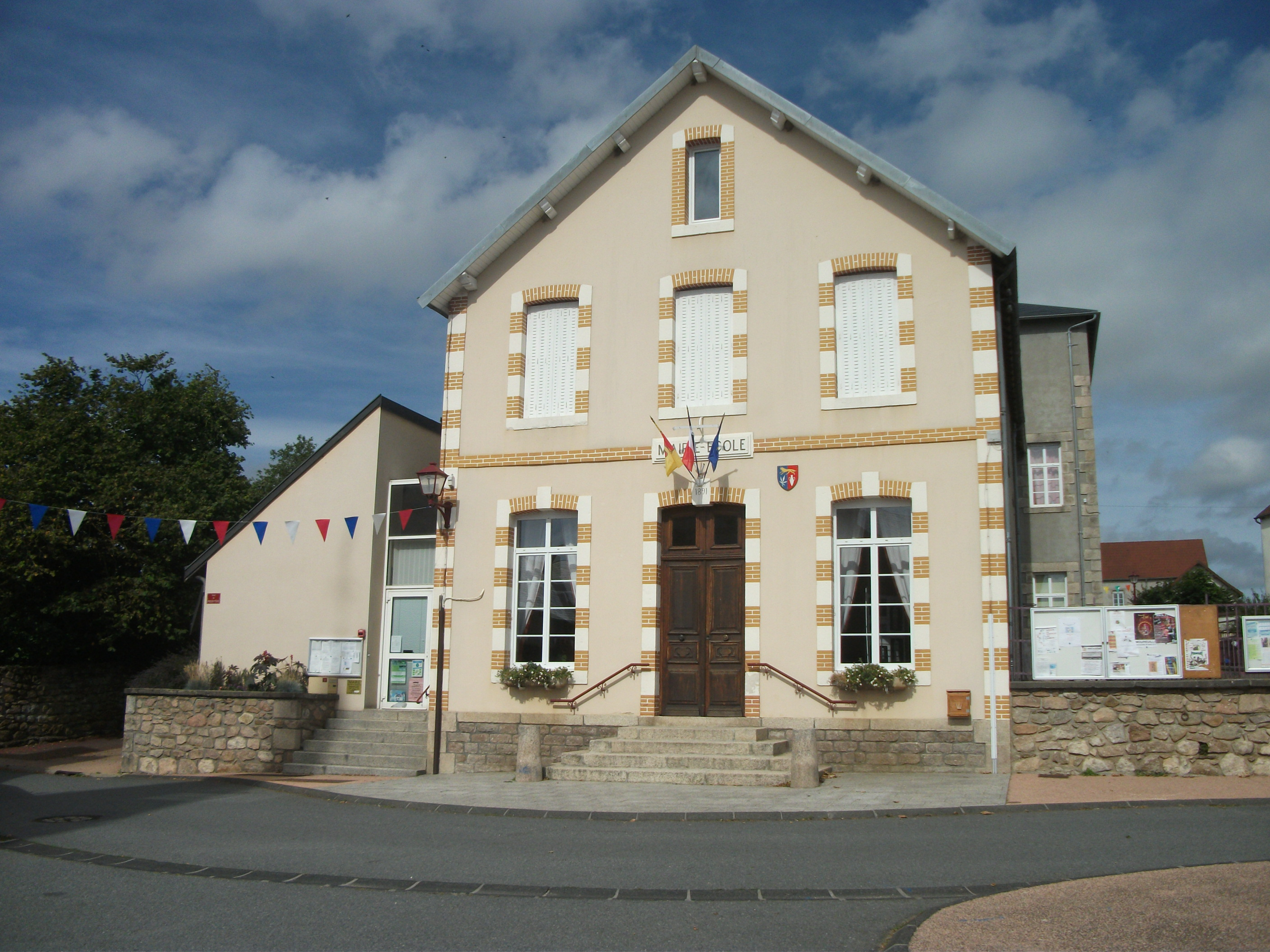
- Servant Town hall

- Coat of arms
- Location of Servant
- Location within France Location within Auvergne-Rhône-Alpes
- Coordinates: 46°08′22″N 2°55′47″E
- Country: France
- Region: Auvergne-Rhône-Alpes
- Department: Puy-de-Dôme
- Arrondissement: Riom
- Canton: Saint-Éloy-les-Mines
- Intercommunality: CC Pays de Saint-Éloy

Government
  - Mayor (2026–32): Sylvain Durin
- Area^{1}: 26.56 km^{2} (10.25 sq mi)
- Elevation: 620 m (2,030 ft)
- Highest elevation: 724 m (2,375 ft)
- Lowest elevation: 333 m (1,093 ft)
- Population (2023): 558
  - Density: 21.0/km^{2} (54.4/sq mi)
- Time zone: UTC+01:00 (CET)
  - Summer (DST): UTC+02:00 (CEST)
- INSEE/Postal code: 63419 /63560
- ^{1} French Land Register data, which excludes lakes, ponds, glaciers > 1 km^{2} (0.386 sq mi or 247 acres) and river estuaries.

Servant (French pronunciation: [sɛʁvɑ̃]) is a commune in the Puy-de-Dôme department in Auvergne in central France.

== See also ==
- Communes of the Puy-de-Dôme department
