= Bussières =

Bussières is a surname. Notable people with the name include:

- Arthur de Bussières (1877–1913), Canadian poet
- Lizanne Bussières (born 1961), Canadian long-distance runner
- Pascale Bussières (born 1968), French Canadian actress
- Pierre Bussières (1939–2014), Canadian politician
- Raymond Bussières (1907–1982), French film actor

== See also ==
- Bussière
