= Saint-Gervais-d'Auvergne =

- Commune
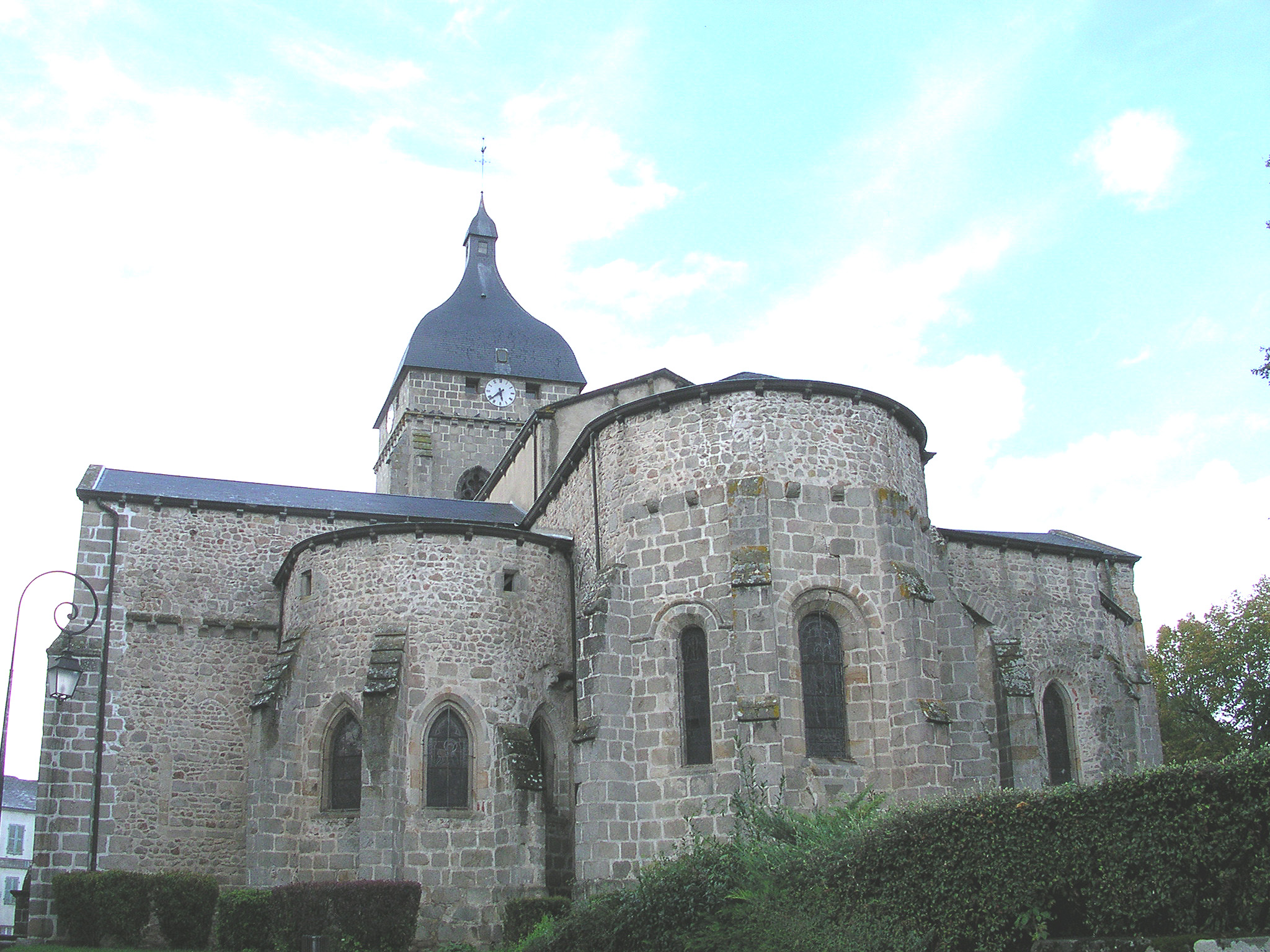
- The church in Saint-Gervais-d'Auvergne

- Coat of arms
- Location of Saint-Gervais-d'Auvergne
- Location within France Location within Auvergne-Rhône-Alpes
- Coordinates: 46°02′N 2°49′E
- Country: France
- Region: Auvergne-Rhône-Alpes
- Department: Puy-de-Dôme
- Arrondissement: Riom
- Canton: Saint-Éloy-les-Mines
- Intercommunality: CC Pays de Saint-Éloy

Government
  - Mayor (2026–32): Jean-Claude Gaillard
- Area^{1}: 47.35 km^{2} (18.28 sq mi)
- Elevation: 729 m (2,392 ft)
- Highest elevation: 742 m (2,434 ft)
- Lowest elevation: 390 m (1,280 ft)
- Population (2023): 1,192
  - Density: 25.17/km^{2} (65.20/sq mi)
- Time zone: UTC+01:00 (CET)
  - Summer (DST): UTC+02:00 (CEST)
- INSEE/Postal code: 63354 /63390
- ^{1} French Land Register data, which excludes lakes, ponds, glaciers > 1 km^{2} (0.386 sq mi or 247 acres) and river estuaries.

Saint-Gervais-d'Auvergne (French pronunciation: [sɛ̃ ʒɛʁvɛ dovɛʁɲ]; Auvergnat: Sent Gervais d’Auvèrnhe) is a commune in the Puy-de-Dôme department in Auvergne in central France.

== See also ==
- Communes of the Puy-de-Dôme department
