= Charensat =

- Commune
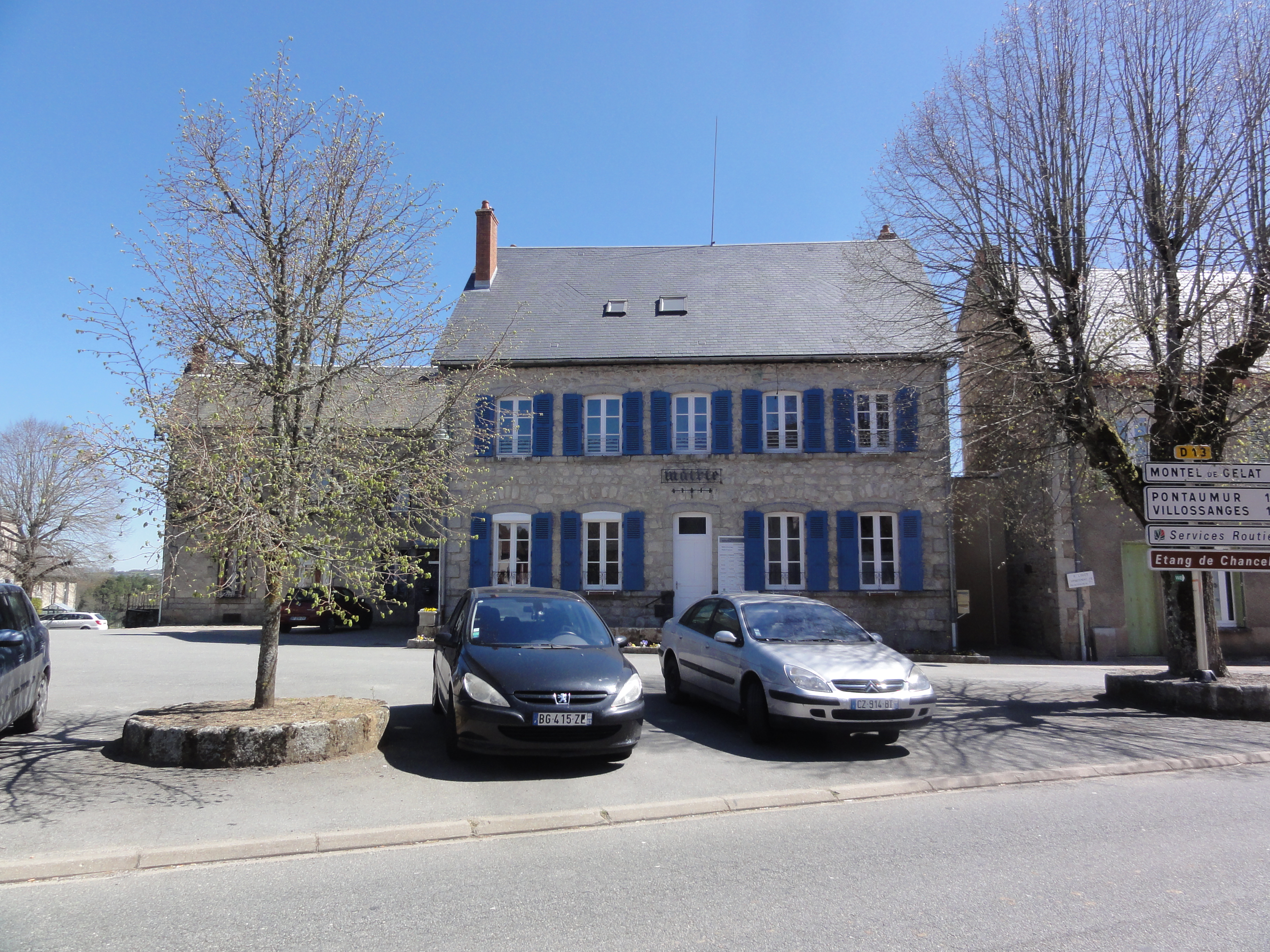
- The town hall in Charensat

- Coat of arms
- Location of Charensat
- Location within France Location within Auvergne-Rhône-Alpes
- Coordinates: 45°59′15″N 2°38′13″E
- Country: France
- Region: Auvergne-Rhône-Alpes
- Department: Puy-de-Dôme
- Arrondissement: Riom
- Canton: Saint-Éloy-les-Mines
- Intercommunality: CC Pays de Saint-Éloy

Government
  - Mayor (2020–2026): François Blanchon
- Area^{1}: 46.68 km^{2} (18.02 sq mi)
- Elevation: 685 m (2,247 ft)
- Highest elevation: 764 m (2,507 ft)
- Lowest elevation: 546 m (1,791 ft)
- Population (2023): 470
  - Density: 10/km^{2} (26/sq mi)
- Time zone: UTC+01:00 (CET)
  - Summer (DST): UTC+02:00 (CEST)
- INSEE/Postal code: 63094 /63640
- ^{1} French Land Register data, which excludes lakes, ponds, glaciers > 1 km^{2} (0.386 sq mi or 247 acres) and river estuaries.

Charensat (French pronunciation: [ʃaʁɑ̃sa]) is a commune in the Puy-de-Dôme department in Auvergne-Rhône-Alpes in central France.

== See also ==
- Communes of the Puy-de-Dôme department
