= Bussières, Puy-de-Dôme =

Bussières
- Commune
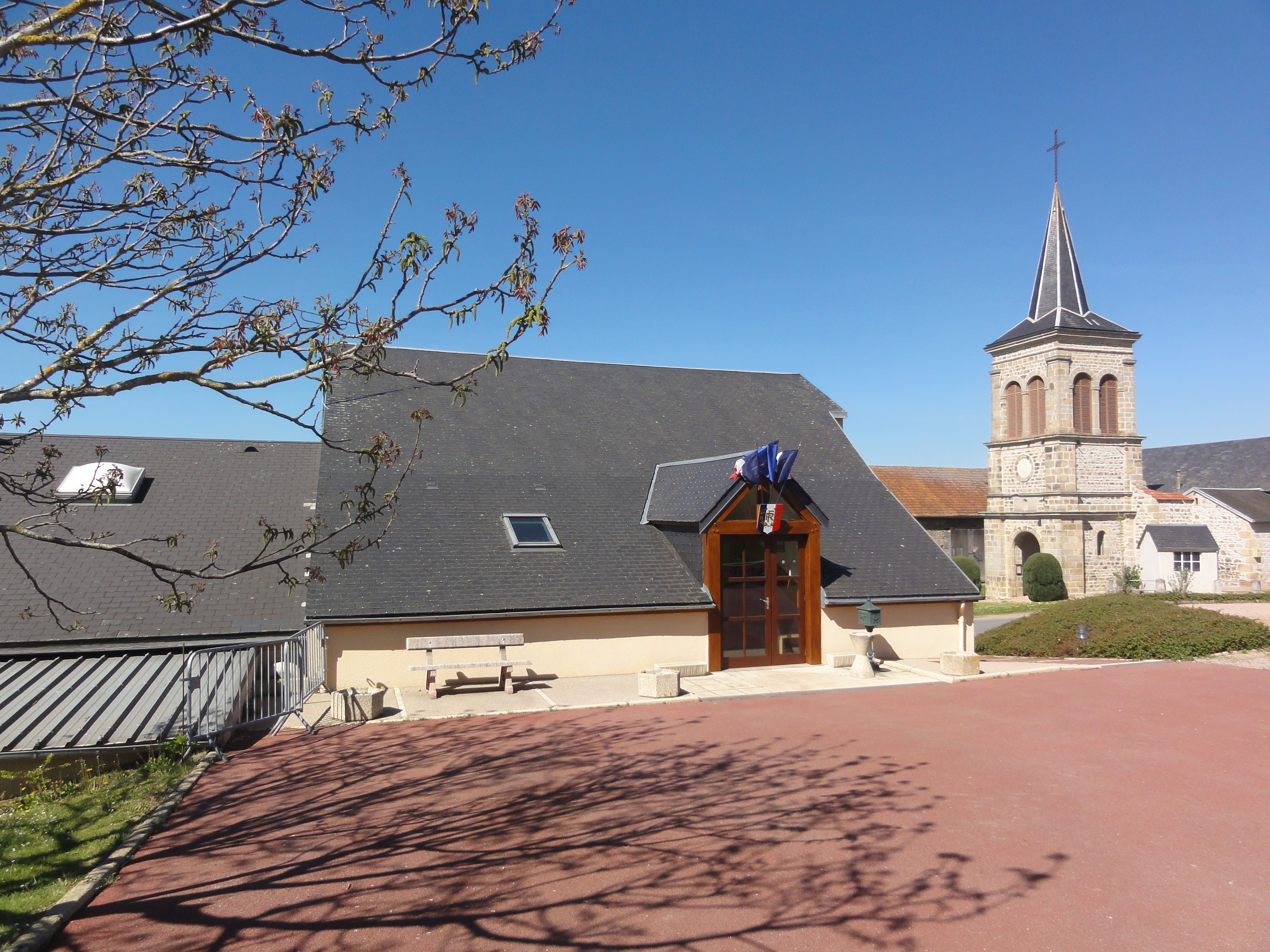
- The town hall and church in Bussières
- Location of Bussières
- Location within France Location within Auvergne-Rhône-Alpes
- Coordinates: 46°04′16″N 2°38′02″E
- Country: France
- Region: Auvergne-Rhône-Alpes
- Department: Puy-de-Dôme
- Arrondissement: Riom
- Canton: Saint-Éloy-les-Mines
- Intercommunality: CC Pays de Saint-Éloy

Government
  - Mayor (2026–32): Claude Dubosclard
- Area^{1}: 13.84 km^{2} (5.34 sq mi)
- Elevation: 560 m (1,840 ft)
- Highest elevation: 754 m (2,474 ft)
- Lowest elevation: 469 m (1,539 ft)
- Population (2023): 109
  - Density: 7.88/km^{2} (20.4/sq mi)
- Time zone: UTC+01:00 (CET)
  - Summer (DST): UTC+02:00 (CEST)
- INSEE/Postal code: 63060 /63330
- ^{1} French Land Register data, which excludes lakes, ponds, glaciers > 1 km^{2} (0.386 sq mi or 247 acres) and river estuaries.

Bussières (French pronunciation: [bysjɛʁ]; Occitan: Bussèiras) is a commune in the Puy-de-Dôme department in Auvergne-Rhône-Alpes in central France.

== Population ==
Historical population
Year	Pop.	±% p.a.
1968	215	—
1975	206	−0.61%
1982	165	−3.12%
1990	132	−2.75%
1999	119	−1.15%
2007	108	−1.21%
2012	102	−1.14%
2017	92	−2.04%
2023	109	+2.87%
Source: INSEE

== See also ==
- Communes of the Puy-de-Dôme department
