= Biollet =

- Commune
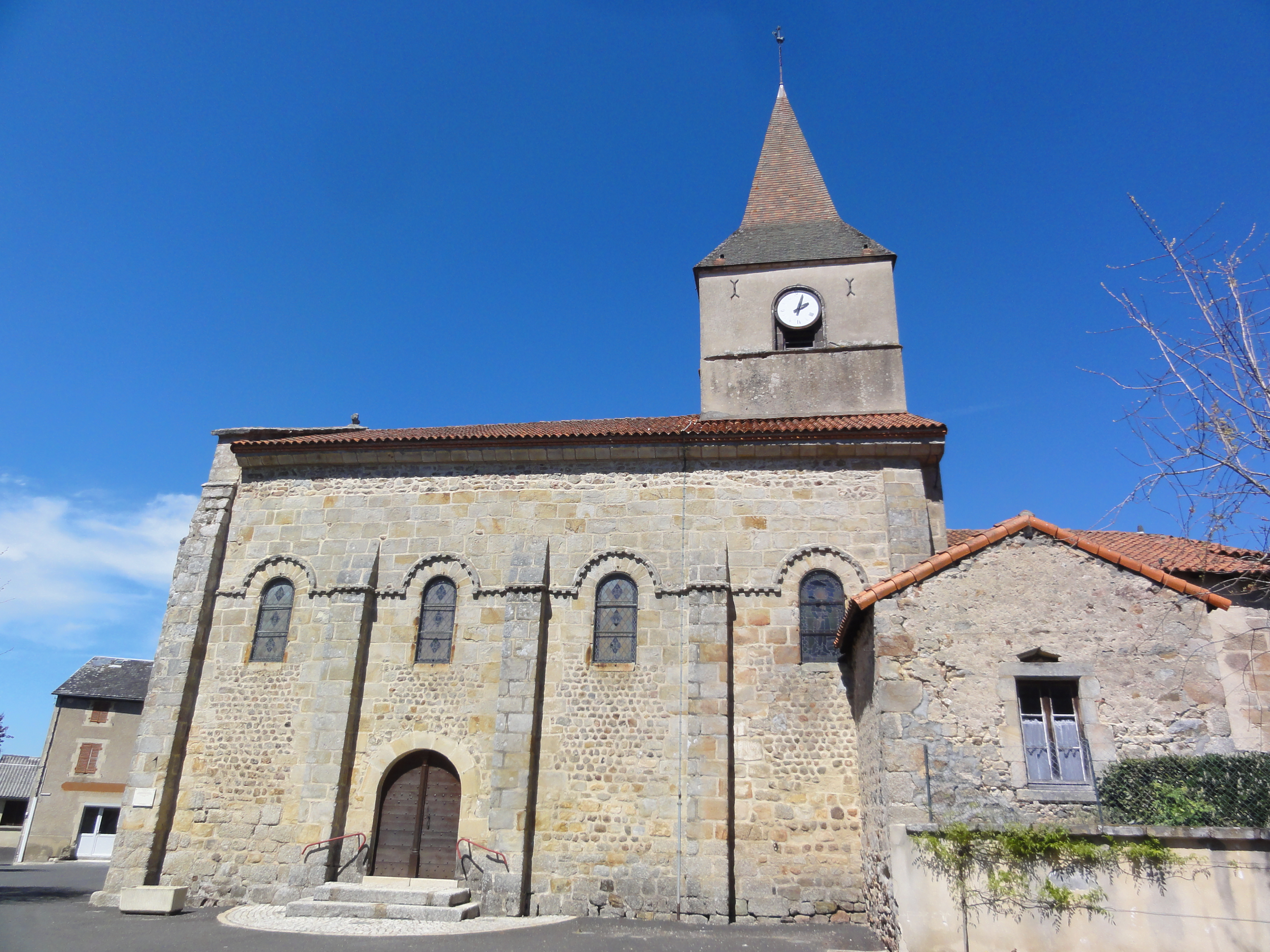
- The church in Biollet

- Coat of arms
- Location of Biollet
- Location within France Location within Auvergne-Rhône-Alpes
- Coordinates: 45°59′39″N 2°41′00″E
- Country: France
- Region: Auvergne-Rhône-Alpes
- Department: Puy-de-Dôme
- Arrondissement: Riom
- Canton: Saint-Éloy-les-Mines
- Intercommunality: CC Pays de Saint-Éloy

Government
  - Mayor (2026–32): David Saby
- Area^{1}: 23.46 km^{2} (9.06 sq mi)
- Elevation: 750 m (2,460 ft)
- Highest elevation: 755 m (2,477 ft)
- Lowest elevation: 620 m (2,030 ft)
- Population (2023): 309
  - Density: 13.2/km^{2} (34.1/sq mi)
- Time zone: UTC+01:00 (CET)
  - Summer (DST): UTC+02:00 (CEST)
- INSEE/Postal code: 63041 /63640
- ^{1} French Land Register data, which excludes lakes, ponds, glaciers > 1 km^{2} (0.386 sq mi or 247 acres) and river estuaries.

Biollet (French pronunciation: [bjɔlɛ]) is a commune in the Puy-de-Dôme department in Auvergne-Rhône-Alpes in central France.

== Population ==
Historical population

Year	Pop.	±% p.a.
1793	987	—
1800	900	−1.31%
1806	1,059	+2.75%
1821	1,082	+0.14%
1831	1,154	+0.65%
1836	1,211	+0.97%
1841	1,178	−0.55%
1846	1,221	+0.72%
1851	1,221	+0.00%
1856	1,196	−0.41%
1861	1,108	−1.52%
1866	1,111	+0.05%
1872	1,088	−0.35%
1876	1,104	+0.37%
1881	1,063	−0.75%
1886	1,004	−1.14%
1891	953	−1.04%
1896	942	−0.23%
1901	946	+0.08%

Year	Pop.	±% p.a.
1906	871	−1.64%
1911	886	+0.34%
1921	782	−1.24%
1926	748	−0.89%
1931	724	−0.65%
1936	700	−0.67%
1946	583	−1.81%
1954	538	−1.00%
1962	510	−0.67%
1968	478	−1.07%
1975	432	−1.44%
1982	404	−0.95%
1990	376	−0.89%
1999	389	+0.38%
2007	334	−1.89%
2012	320	−0.85%
2017	329	+0.56%
2023	309	−1.04%

Source: EHESS and INSEE

== See also ==
- Communes of the Puy-de-Dôme department
