= Montaigut-en-Combraille =

- Commune
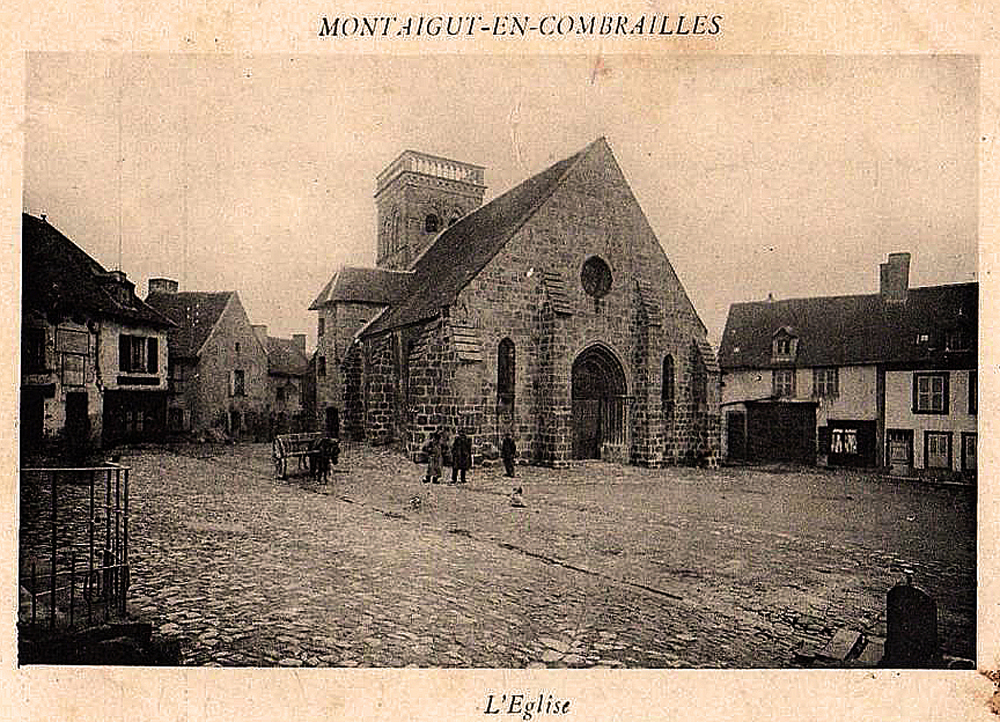
- Notre-Dame-de-Bonne-Nouvelle church

- Coat of arms
- Location of Montaigut-en-Combraille
- Location within France Location within Auvergne-Rhône-Alpes
- Coordinates: 46°10′48″N 2°48′34″E
- Country: France
- Region: Auvergne-Rhône-Alpes
- Department: Puy-de-Dôme
- Arrondissement: Riom
- Canton: Saint-Éloy-les-Mines
- Intercommunality: CC Pays de Saint-Éloy

Government
  - Mayor (2026–32): Jean-Marc Sauterau
- Area^{1}: 8.18 km^{2} (3.16 sq mi)
- Elevation: 626 m (2,054 ft)
- Highest elevation: 714 m (2,343 ft)
- Lowest elevation: 535 m (1,755 ft)
- Population (2023): 972
  - Density: 119/km^{2} (308/sq mi)
- Time zone: UTC+01:00 (CET)
  - Summer (DST): UTC+02:00 (CEST)
- INSEE/Postal code: 63233 /63700
- ^{1} French Land Register data, which excludes lakes, ponds, glaciers > 1 km^{2} (0.386 sq mi or 247 acres) and river estuaries.

Montaigut-en-Combraille (French pronunciation: [mɔ̃tɛɡy ɑ̃ kɔ̃bʁaj], known as Montaigut until 31 December 2022; Occitan: Montagut de Combralhas) is a commune in the Puy-de-Dôme department in Auvergne in central France.

== Population ==
Historical population
Year	Pop.	±% p.a.
1968	1,665	—
1975	1,547	−1.04%
1982	1,476	−0.67%
1990	1,235	−2.20%
1999	1,129	−0.99%
2007	1,066	−0.72%
2012	1,025	−0.78%
2017	987	−0.75%
2023	972	−0.25%
Source: INSEE

== See also ==
- Communes of the Puy-de-Dôme department
