= Saint-Julien-la-Geneste =

- Commune
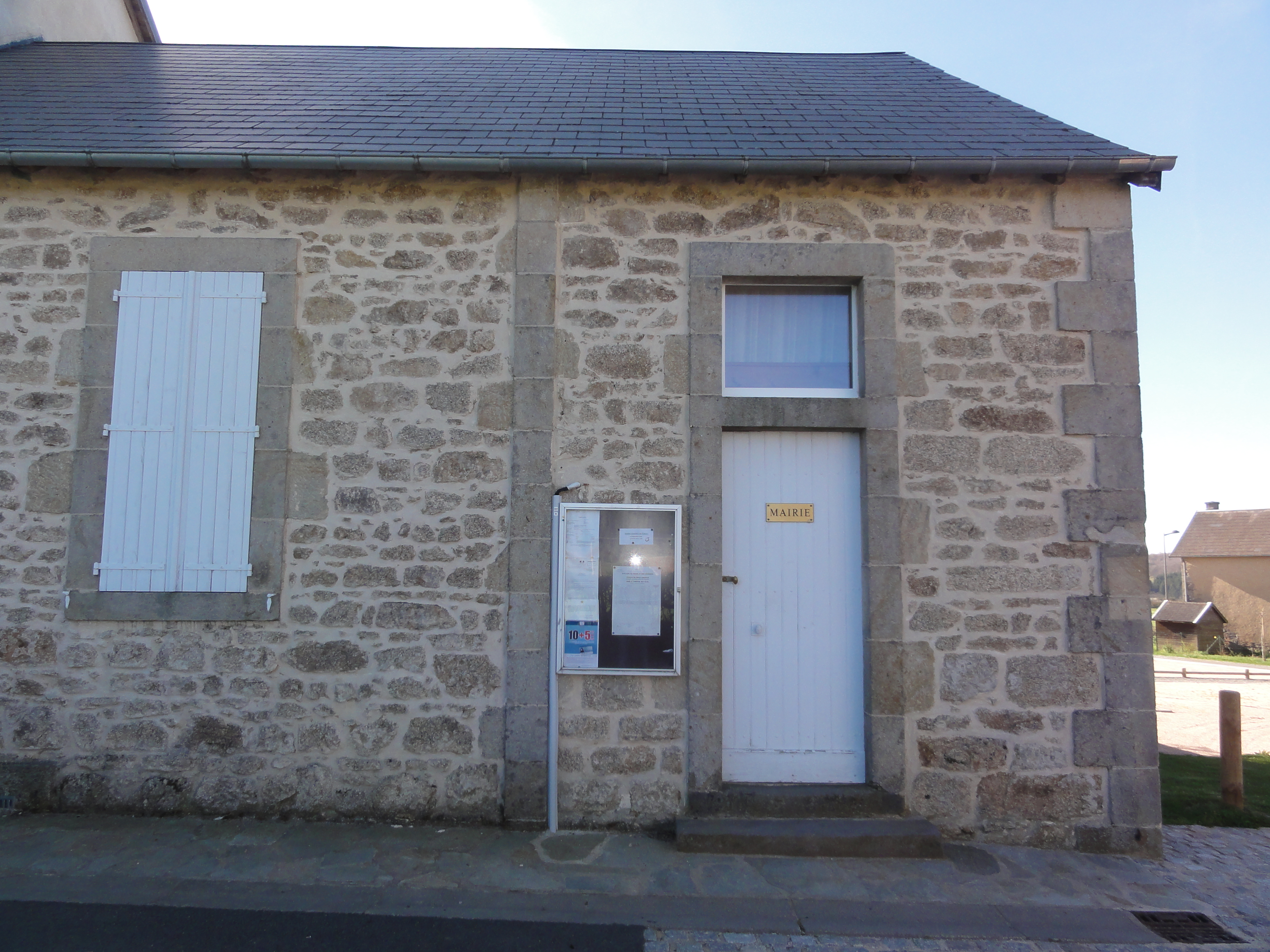
- The town hall in Saint-Julien-la-Geneste
- Location of Saint-Julien-la-Geneste
- Location within France Location within Auvergne-Rhône-Alpes
- Coordinates: 46°03′07″N 2°44′06″E
- Country: France
- Region: Auvergne-Rhône-Alpes
- Department: Puy-de-Dôme
- Arrondissement: Riom
- Canton: Saint-Éloy-les-Mines
- Intercommunality: CC Pays de Saint-Éloy
- Area^{1}: 11.97 km^{2} (4.62 sq mi)
- Elevation: 700 m (2,300 ft)
- Highest elevation: 787 m (2,582 ft)
- Lowest elevation: 597 m (1,959 ft)
- Population (2023): 117
  - Density: 9.77/km^{2} (25.3/sq mi)
- Time zone: UTC+01:00 (CET)
  - Summer (DST): UTC+02:00 (CEST)
- INSEE/Postal code: 63369 /63390
- ^{1} French Land Register data, which excludes lakes, ponds, glaciers > 1 km^{2} (0.386 sq mi or 247 acres) and river estuaries.

Saint-Julien-la-Geneste is a commune in the Puy-de-Dôme department in Auvergne in central France.

== See also ==
- Communes of the Puy-de-Dôme department
