= Genesius, Count of Clermont =

8th-century Frankish saint

- Died: 725

Genesius, Count of Clermont (died 725) was a noble of Gaul and reputed miracle worker. He was said to be Count of Auvergne. His residence was at Combronde.

According to the lessons of the Breviary of the Chapter of Camaleria (Acta Sanctorum June, I, 497), he was of noble birth; his father's name is given as Audastrius, and his mother's is Tranquilla. He was probably a relative of Bishop Genesius.

Even in his youth he is said to have wrought miracles—to have given sight to the blind and cured the lame. He built and richly endowed several churches and religious houses.

The "Martyrdom of Praeiectus" says that when the bishopric of Clermont became vacant, King Childeric had sent edicts to elect Count Genesius, but he turned down the see. Prix then became bishop. Partly by his own ample patrimony, and partly by the great liberalities of Genesius, the holy count of Auvergne, Prix was able to found several monasteries, churches, and hospitals.

Genesius was a friend of Bonitus, Bishop of Clermont, and of Meneleus, Abbot of Menat. He was buried at Combronde by Savinian, successor of Meneleus.

He is a Catholic saint, feast day 5 June.
