= Louis Augustin Guillaume Bosc =

French botanist, zoologist, and entomologist (1759–1828)

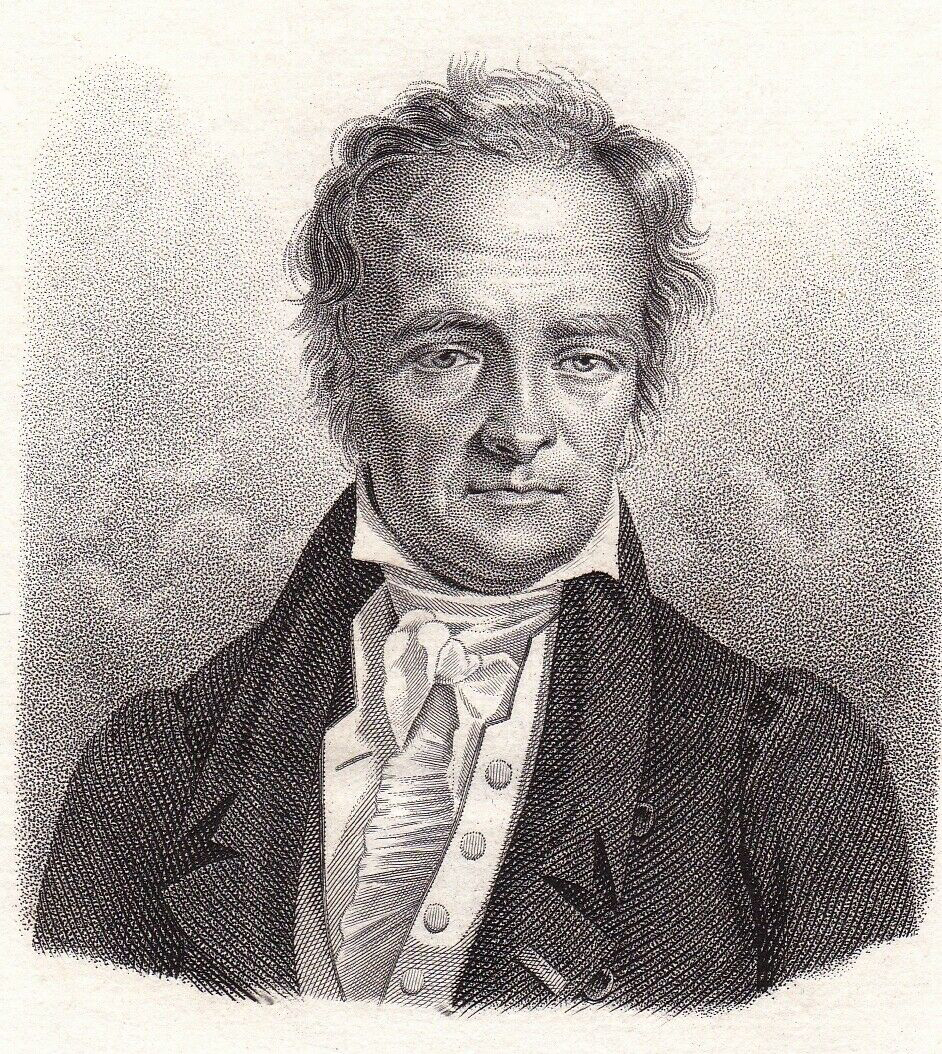
- Born: 29 January 1759; Paris, France
- Died: 10 July 1828 (aged 69); Val-d'Oise, France
- Known for: Histoire naturelle des Coquilles, Histoire naturelle des Vers, Histoire naturelle des Crustacés
- Scientific career
- Fields: Agronomy, Natural History
- Academic advisors: Jean-François Durande, Louis-Bernard Guyton-Morveau
- Author abbrev. (botany): Bosc
- Author abbrev. (zoology): Bosc

Louis Augustin Guillaume Bosc (or Louis-Augustin Bosc d'Antic) (29 January 1759 – 10 July 1828) was a French botanist, invertebrate zoologist, and entomologist.

== Biography ==
Bosc was born in Paris, the son of Paul Bosc d’Antic, a medical doctor and chemist. He studied at Dijon, where he was the pupil of botanist Jean-François Durande and chemist Louis-Bernard Guyton-Morveau. Being unable to become an artilleryman, he worked initially for the office of the controller general and then for the comptroller of the postal service. In time he took courses in botany under Antoine-Laurent de Jussieu and met botanist René Desfontaines and naturalist Pierre Marie Auguste Broussonet. He also took up with Jean Marie Roland and Madame Roland and formed a lasting relationship with Danish entomologist Johan Christian Fabricius. While working for the postal service he carried out work on natural history, publishing a description of a new species of bug, Orthezia characias, and a method of preserving insect larvae.

In 1785 Bosc was invited to join the Lapérouse round the world expedition as a naturalist, but declined. This was fortunate for him, as the expedition was lost after leaving Botany Bay in March 1788. Together with André Thouin, Pierre Marie Auguste Broussonet, Aubin-Louis Millin de Grandmaison and Pierre Willemet, Bosc participated, in 1787, in the founding of the first Linnean society in the world, the Société linnéenne de Paris. They were soon joined by other naturalists. This society was dissolved in 1789, in part due to hostility from the established Académie Royale des Sciences. Both Bosc and Broussonet were among the first foreign members of the Linnean Society of London.

Plate showing an octopus and a lizard, from an article by Bosc in Actes

After the Storming of the Bastille in 1789, new laws in France permitted freedom of the press and assembly, allowing the formation of new societies, newspapers and journals. Among these was the Société d'Histoire Naturelle, founded in 1790 in Bosc's Home. Its journal, Actes de la société d'histoire naturelle de Paris was short-lived, but included a number of items by Bosc.. Both Bosc and the Society were politically active, with Republican leanings. Bosc was a member of the Jacobin Club. He was also an active member of the Philomatic Society of Paris.

His friendship with Roland allowed Bosc to rise to a substantial position, but when that minister fell into disgrace he was dismissed on 31 May 1793. Bosc left Paris, and lived as a country former in the forest of Montmorency. He sheltered several people persecuted by the Terror, including Roland and Louis-Marie de La Révellière-Lépeaux. It was at this time he became tutor to Eudora Roland, Roland's daughter. La Réveliière-Lépeaux, having become a member of the Directoire, allowed Bosc to leave for the United States, first as vice-consul to Wilmington in 1797, then as consul to New York in 1798. Upon his return to France, he published Memoire sur quelques especes des champignons des parties meridionales de l'Amerique septentrionale (1811). This work was the first-ever systematic examination of the mushrooms of the southern United States, and established Bosc as the founder of mycology in that region.

Bosc was brought back to France, where he served for a time as administrator of hospitals and prisons and obtained, in 1803, after a sojourn in Switzerland and Italy courtesy of Georges Cuvier, a position in the gardens and nurseries of Versailles. He gave his collections to his naturalist friends. Thus, Fabricius and Guillaume-Antoine Olivier received his insects; François Marie Daudin, his birds; Pierre André Latreille, his reptiles; and the comte de Lacépède, his fish. He was also the friend and protector of naturalists Jean-Baptiste Bory de Saint-Vincent and Jean-Marie Léon Dufour.

In 1806, he was elected to membership in the Académie des sciences in the rural husbandry section. In 1825, he succeeded André Thouin to the chair of plant culture at the National Museum of Natural History in Paris.

He died unexpectedly not many years later in Paris, in 1828.

== Legacy ==
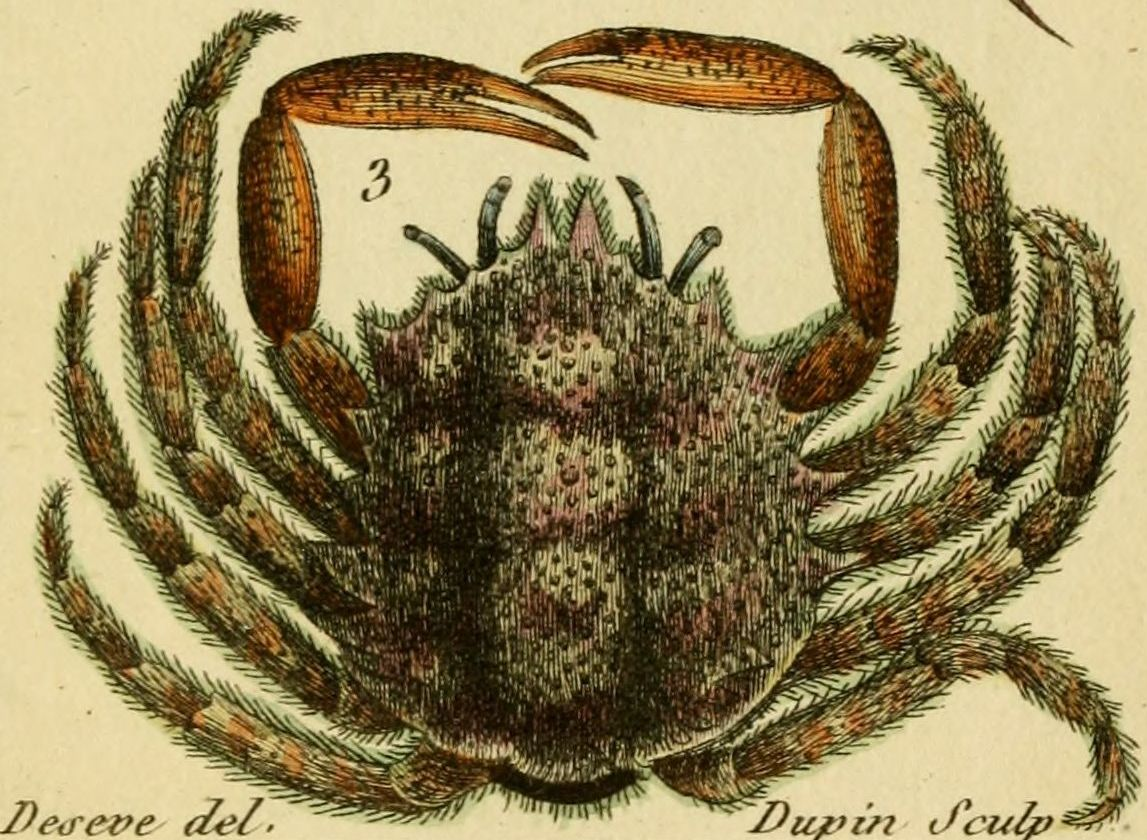
Maja squinado (spider crab) from Histoire naturelle des Crustacés (1802)

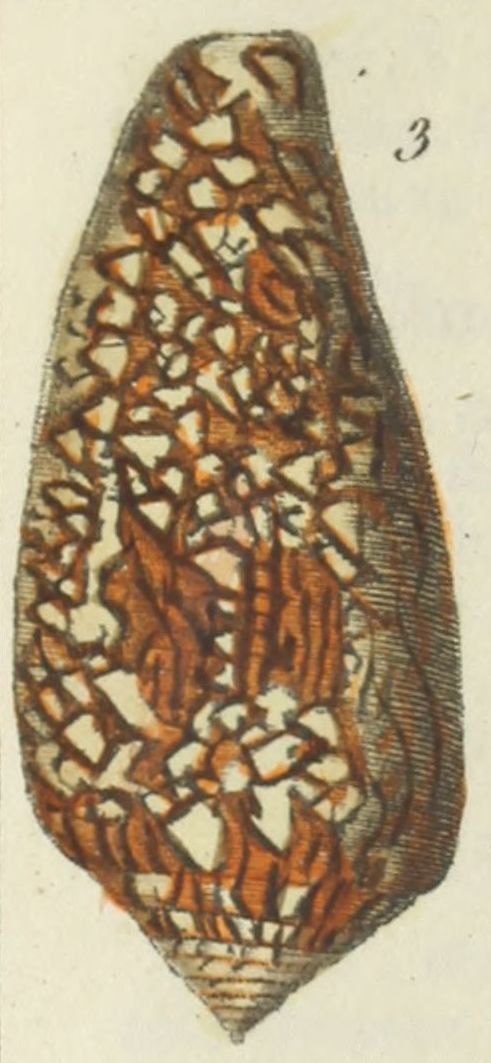
Conus textile from Histoire naturelle des Coquilles (1802)

Bosc's legacy lies mainly in the fields of agronomy and natural history. He was the author of three volumes of Suites à Buffon, edited by René Richard Louis Castel: Histoire naturelle des Coquilles (Paris, 5 volumes, 1802); Histoire naturelle des Vers (Paris, 3 volumes, 1802); and Histoire naturelle des Crustacés (Paris, 2 volumes, 1802).

Bosc participated in the editing of the Nouveau Dictionnaire d'histoire naturelle appliquée aux arts, principalement à l'agriculture, à l'économie rurale et domestique, under the direction of Jean-François-Pierre Deterville and Sonnini de Manoncourt (Paris, 24 volumes, 1803–1804, re-edited in 36 volumes, 1816–1819), and the Nouveau Cours complet d'agriculture théorique et pratique, also directed by Deterville (Paris, 13 volumes, 1809, re-edited in 16 volumes, 1821–1823). Bosc also supervised the editing and republication of the agricultural classic, Théâtre d'agriculture (1600) by Olivier de Serres, published by the Société centrale d'agriculture de Paris, whose Annales he also published.

Notton (2007) provides a catogue of parasitic wasps with reference to Bosc's collection. Dolan (2020) gives a full bibliography of Bosc's publications, and a list of all the species described by him.

Bosc's grave lies in a little cemetery in the forest of Montmorency, a National Forest open to the public, in the commune of Saint-Prix in the Val-d'Oise.

Bosc's insect collection is shared between the Natural History Museum of Geneva, Muséum national d'histoire naturelle in Paris, and the Natural History Museum in London (Louis Alexandre Auguste Chevrolat collection).

Bosc is commemorated in the scientific name of a species of lizard, Acanthodactylus boskianus.
