= Newsteadia myersi =

Scientific classification
- Domain: Eukaryota
- Kingdom: Animalia
- Phylum: Arthropoda
- Class: Insecta
- Order: Hemiptera
- Suborder: Sternorrhyncha
- Family: Ortheziidae
- Genus: Newsteadia
- Species: N. myersi

Binomial name
- Newsteadia myersi Green, 1929

Species of true bug

Newsteadia myersi is the only member of the scale insect family Ortheziidae to have been found in New Zealand. It was found by sifting through the leaf litter and debris under nīkau palm trees (Rhopalostylis sapida).

== Description ==
The adult female has a rounded oval body with inconspicuous segmentation. It is about 1.1 millimetres long by 0.85 millimetres wide. The rounded eyes are on short stalks located near the base of the antennae which are slender, about 0.7 millimetres long and normally have four segments. The legs are long and slender with a small number of setae. The upper side of the body has ten bands of short spines which are wide at the base and quickly taper to the tip. The underside is also banded with spines and the anterior section of the ovisac band is thickly covered with rather larger spines. The underside has a spiracle on each segment. The anal ring is surrounded by a double row of pores and has a bunch of six backward pointing setae.

== Biology ==
Very little is known of the life history of this species but it is likely to have four instars as in other members of the genus. It may feed on the hyphae of fungi growing in the leaf litter where it lives, or possibly on the living roots of plants.
