= Newsteadia floccosa =

Scientific classification
- Domain: Eukaryota
- Kingdom: Animalia
- Phylum: Arthropoda
- Class: Insecta
- Order: Hemiptera
- Suborder: Sternorrhyncha
- Family: Ortheziidae
- Genus: Newsteadia
- Species: N. floccosa

Binomial name
- Newsteadia floccosa (De Geer, 1778)

Species of true bug

Newsteadia floccosa, the boreal ensign scale, is a species of scale insect in the family Ortheziidae. It is native to Europe and is found in the soil and amongst plant litter and mosses on the ground.

== Description ==
The adult female is about 1.6 mm (0.063 in) long and has a round or oval shape, a pair of yellow antennae, three pairs of yellow legs and no wings. The antennae usually have six segments, the two basal ones being larger than the remainder. The eyes are borne on curved stalks. The upper surface of the body is yellow and covered by ten ornate, white waxy plates, in two longitudinal rows; the sides of the insect bear a further ten marginal waxy processes, which are smallest at the front and largest at the rear. Behind the insect is the ovisac, a waxy pouch that encloses the eggs, extending from the underside of the abdomen. It has ribbed sculpting and is similar in length to the body. The adult male has been described but is seldom observed.

== Distribution and habitat ==
Newsteadia floccosa has been found in soil samples taken from Austria, Belgium, Bulgaria, Corsica, Croatia, Czech Republic, Denmark, Finland, France, Germany, Hungary, Ireland, Italy, Lithuania, Netherlands, Poland, Romania, Russia, Spain, Sweden and the United Kingdom. In a Europe-wide study conducted using samples from the Hungarian Natural History Museum, this species was found to be the most common scale insect present in the soil. Although there was some variability across the range, especially in the number of antennal segments, the researchers were satisfied that they represented morphological variation of N. floccosa. It is found at high elevations in moss growing in wet meadows as well as in forest floor litter.

== Ecology ==
Scale insects in general feed by sucking the sap of plants, however the feeding habits of this and other members of the genus Newsteadia are unclear; Morrison (1925) suggested that it might feed on fungal hyphae, or alternatively suck sap from exposed roots.
