= Hyperaspis orthivora =

Scientific classification
- Kingdom: Animalia
- Phylum: Arthropoda
- Clade: Pancrustacea
- Class: Insecta
- Order: Coleoptera
- Suborder: Polyphaga
- Infraorder: Cucujiformia
- Family: Coccinellidae
- Genus: Hyperaspis
- Species: H. orthivora

Binomial name
- Hyperaspis orthivora Gordon & Canepari, 2008

Species of beetle

Hyperaspis orthivora is a species of beetle of the family Coccinellidae. It is found in Colombia.

== Description ==
Adults reach a length of about 2.4–2.7 mm. They have a yellow body. The pronotum has five pale brown spots. The elytron is pale mottled brown with three yellow spots.

== Etymology ==
The species name is combination of the first four letters of the scale-insect genus name Orthezia and the Latin vorator (meaning devourer) and refers to the scale-eating habits of this species.
