= Menat (disambiguation) =

A menat is a type of artefact associated with the Egyptian goddess Hathor, sometimes used as an alternative name for the goddess herself.

Menat may also refer to:

- MENAT, the region comprising the Middle East, North Africa, and Turkey
- Menat, Puy-de-Dôme, a village and commune in France
- Menat Abbey, a monastery in Menat, Puy-de-Dôme
- Menat Formation, geologic formation in France
- Menat (Street Fighter), a playable character in the video game Street Fighter V
