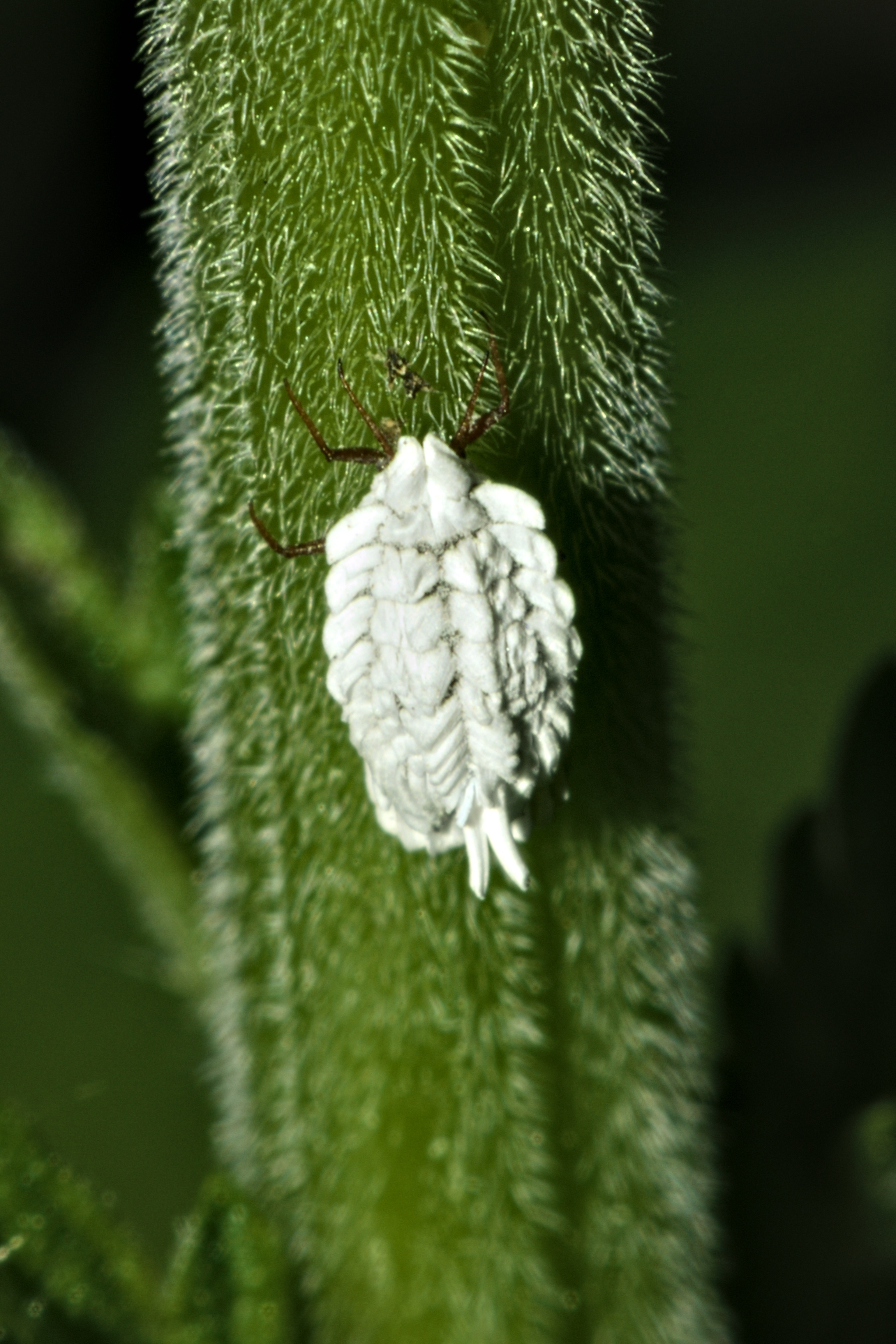

Scientific classification
- Kingdom: Animalia
- Phylum: Arthropoda
- Clade: Pancrustacea
- Class: Insecta
- Order: Hemiptera
- Suborder: Sternorrhyncha
- Family: Ortheziidae
- Genus: Orthezia
- Species: O. urticae

Binomial name
- Orthezia urticae (Linnaeus, 1758)

Synonyms
- Orthezia arenariae Vayssière, 1924; Orthezia japonica Kuwana, 1917; Orthezia martelli Leonardi, 1908; Orthezia maenariensis Douglas, 1884; Orthezia urticae Signoret, 1876; Orthezia cataphracta Signoret, 1876; Dorthezia dispar Kaltenbach, 1874; Dorthesia urticae Burmeister, 1835; Coccus glechomae Burmeister, 1835; Dorthezia delavauxii Thiebaut, 1825; Aphis urticata Stewart, 1802; Coccus dubius Fabricius, 1794; Coccus characias Olivier, 1791; Dorthezia characias Bosc d'Antic, 1785; Orthezia characias Bosc d'Antic, 1784; Aphis urticae Linnaeus, 1758

= Orthezia urticae =

Species of true bug

Orthezia urticae is a species of scale insect in the family Ortheziidae.

== Taxonomy ==
The species was first described in 1758 by the Swedish naturalist Carl Linnaeus under the original name Aphis urticae. Taxon was then moved to the genus Orthezia together with O. yashushii, O. ambrosicola, O. annae, O. argrimoniae, O. boliviana, O. sonorensis, O. lasiorum, and others.

== Distribution ==
Palearctic realm: northern Eurasia and northern Africa (except deserts) from Western Europe to Algeria, Morocco, China and Turkmenistan. In Russia it is present in: Kamchatka Krai, Primorsky Krai, Sakhalin Oblast, Kuril Islands and Tyumen Oblast.

== Description ==
Small lamellar insects. From above, the back of females is oval and covered with six white wax plates. The wax coating is rounded. The anatomy of males and larvae are not well known. The insects have 7-8 pairs of abdominal spiracles. Found on stems and leaves, they feed on the juices of various herbaceous plants, such as nettle, wormwood, bergenia, spirea and many others (wide polyphagy).

== Image gallery ==
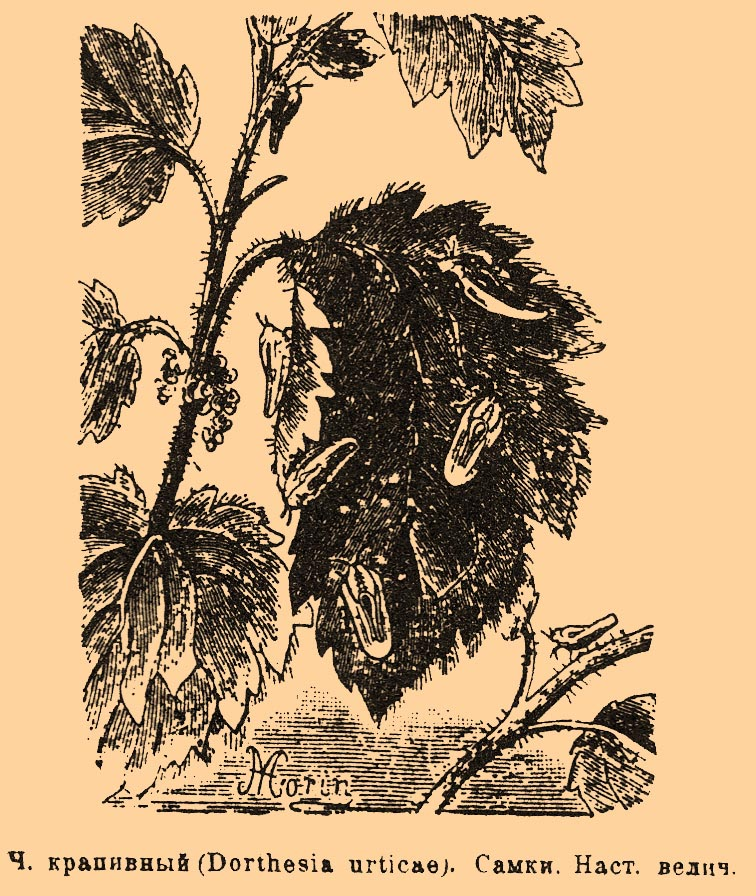

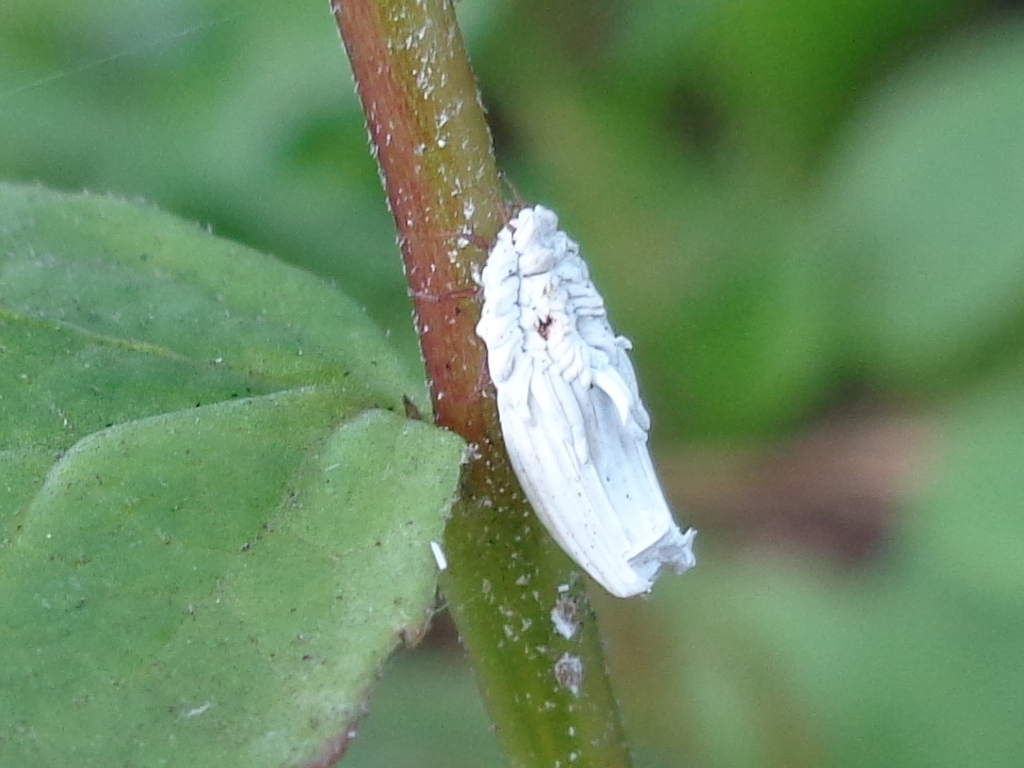

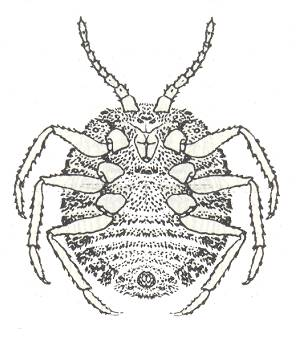

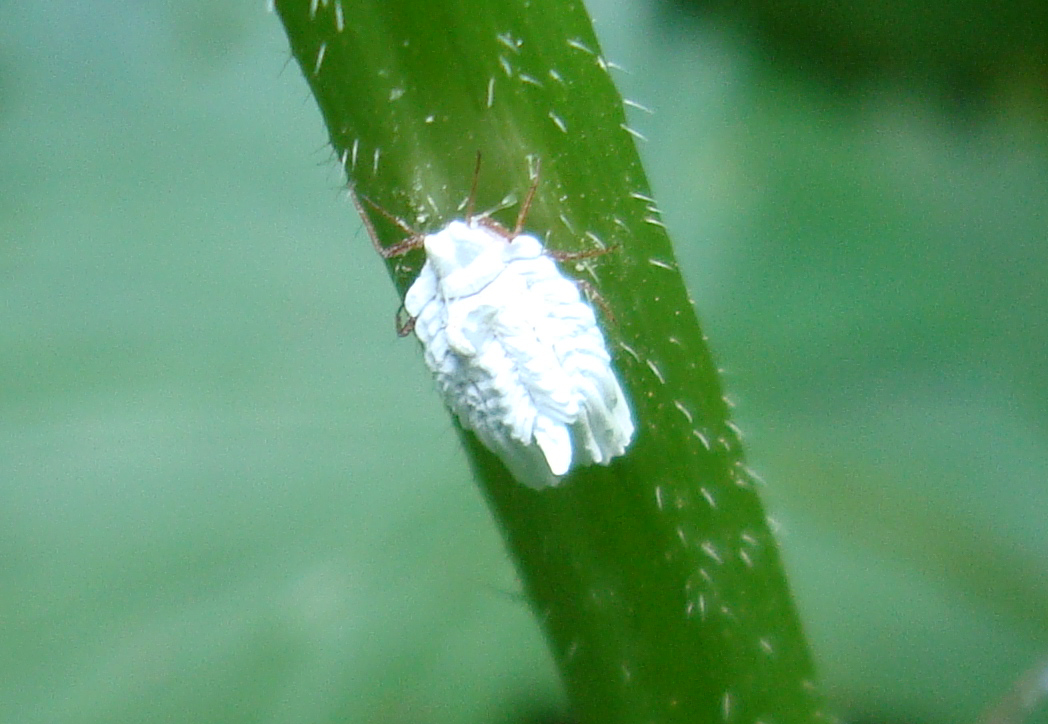

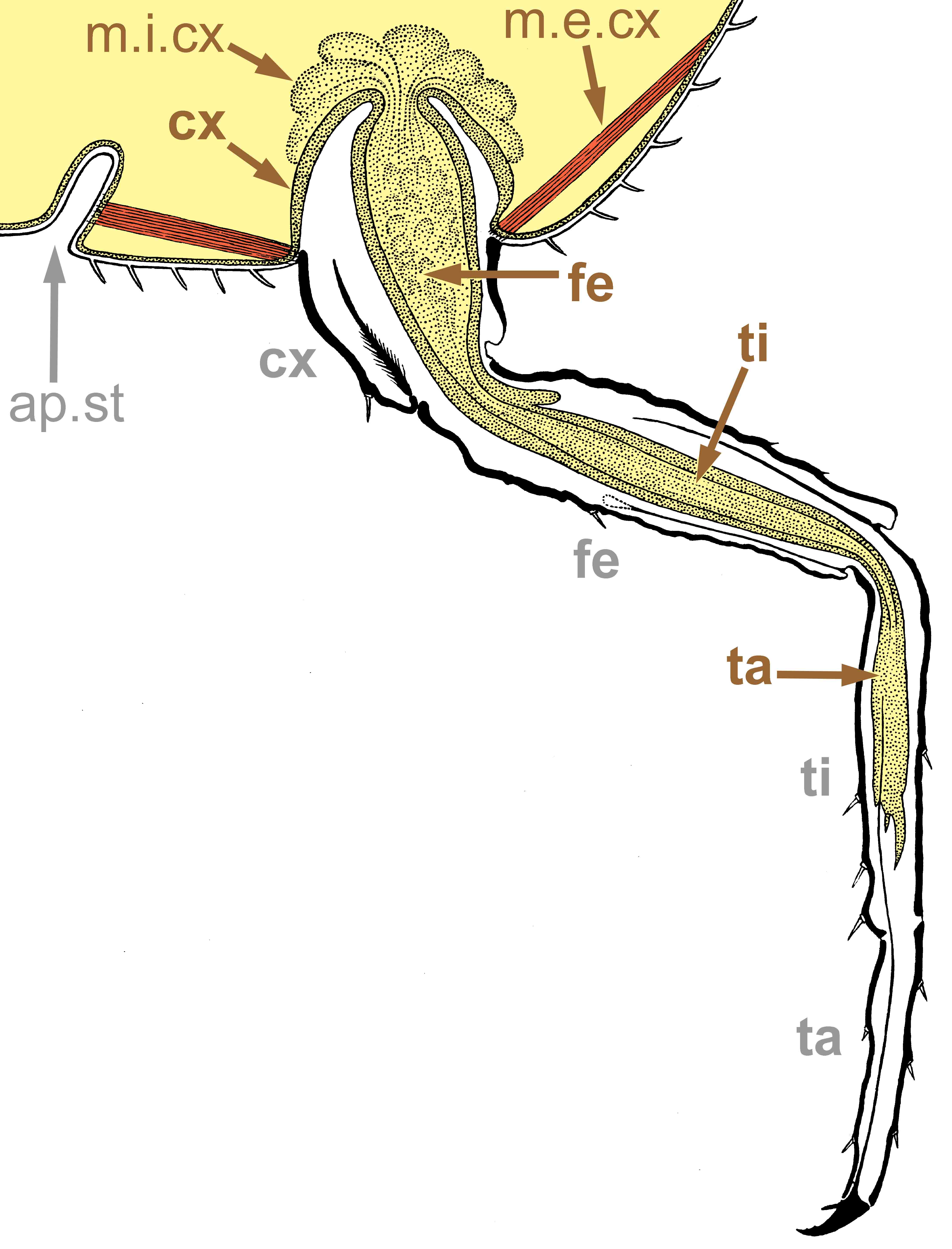

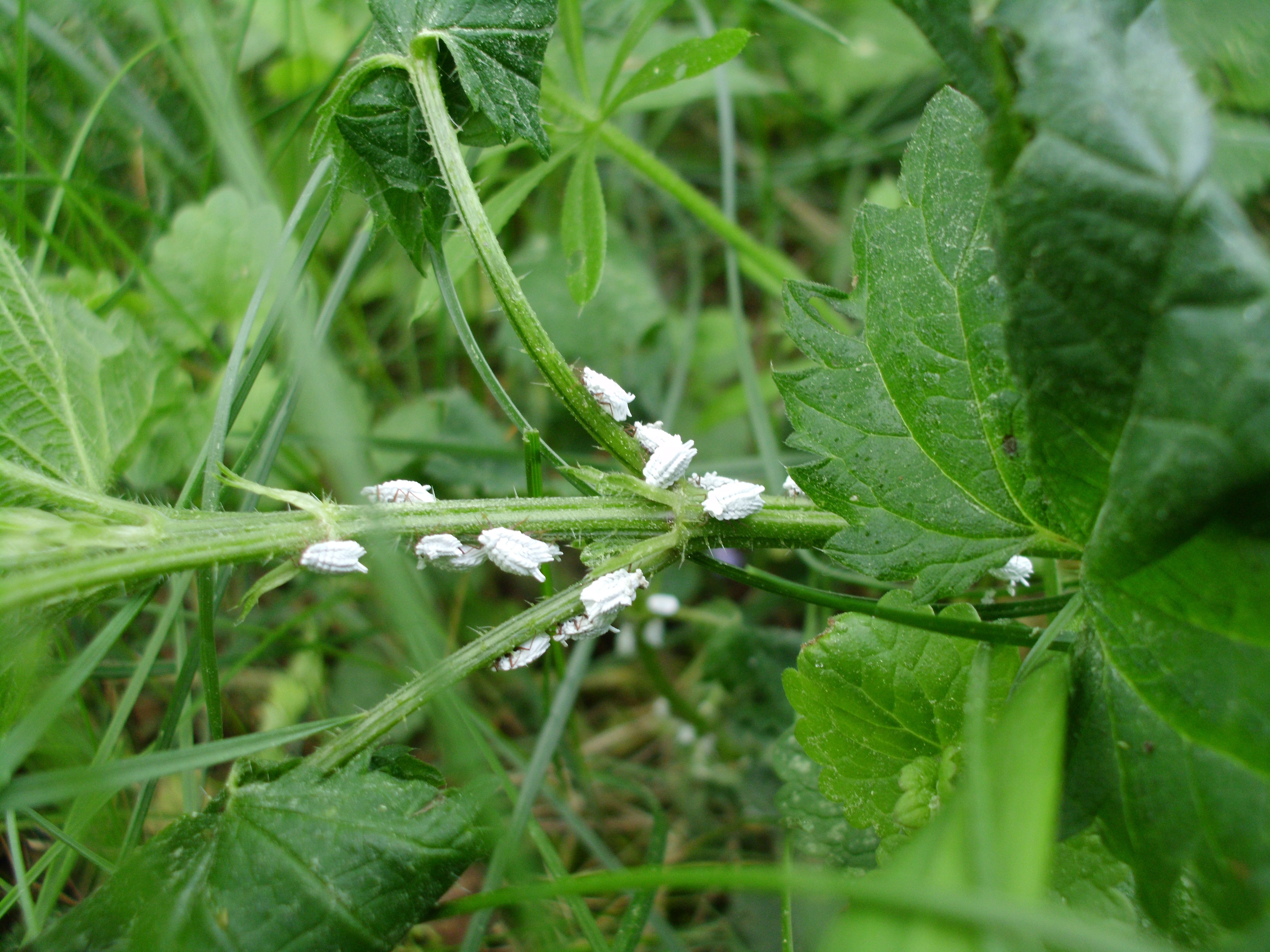

== Literature ==
- Gullan, P. J. & Kosztarab. (1997). "Adaptations in scale insects". Annual Review of Entomology. 42 (Annual Review of Entomology ed.): 23–50. doi:10.1146/annurev.ento.42.1.23. PMID 15012306.
- Kozár, F. (2004). Ortheziidae of the World. Budapest, Hungary: Plant Protection Institute. Hungarian Academy of Sciences.
