= Newsteadia =

Scientific classification
- Domain: Eukaryota
- Kingdom: Animalia
- Phylum: Arthropoda
- Class: Insecta
- Order: Hemiptera
- Suborder: Sternorrhyncha
- Family: Ortheziidae
- Genus: Newsteadia; Green, 1902

Species
- See text

Genus of true bugs

Newsteadia is a genus of ensign scale insects in the superfamily Coccoidea. Most species are inconspicuous, measuring under two millimeters long and found in leaf litter.

== Species ==
In 1962, J. M. Hoy stated there were 11 species in the genus. This has since risen to 48 species. These include:

- Newsteadia americana Morrison - United States
- Newsteadia caledoniensis
- Newsteadia floccosa De Geer – Europe
- Newsteadia guadalcanalia Morrison – Solomon Islands
- Newsteadia gullanae
- Newsteadia mauritania Mamet – Mauritius
- Newsteadia minima Morrison – United States
- Newsteadia montana Mamet – Mauritius
- Newsteadia multispina – Afrotropical
- Newsteadia myersi Green – New Zealand
- Newsteadia samoana Morrison – Samoa
- Newsteadia trisegmentalis James Howell – United States
- Newsteadia tristani Silvestri – Mexico and Costa Rica
- Newsteadia wacri Strickland – Ghana
- Newsteadia yanbaruensis Hirotaka – Japan
- Newsteadia zimmermani Morrison – Fiji
