= Volvic =

- Commune
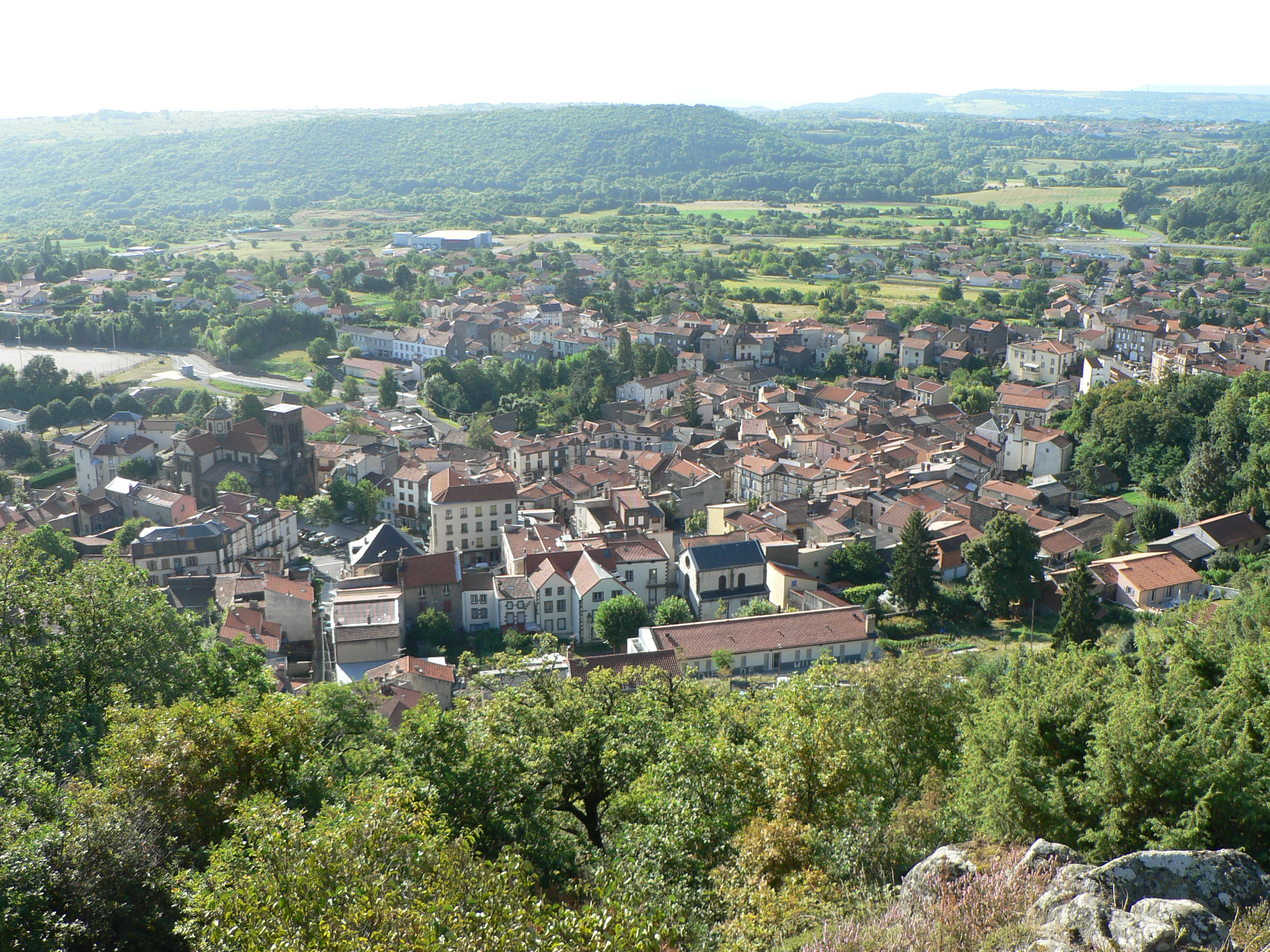
- A general view of Volvic

- Coat of arms
- Location of Volvic
- Location within France Location within Auvergne-Rhône-Alpes
- Coordinates: 45°52′16″N 3°02′16″E
- Country: France
- Region: Auvergne-Rhône-Alpes
- Department: Puy-de-Dôme
- Arrondissement: Riom
- Canton: Châtel-Guyon
- Intercommunality: CA Riom Limagne et Volcans

Government
  - Mayor (2026–32): Laurent Thevenot
- Area^{1}: 27.78 km^{2} (10.73 sq mi)
- Elevation: 500 m (1,600 ft)
- Highest elevation: 998 m (3,274 ft)
- Lowest elevation: 392 m (1,286 ft)
- Population (2023): 4,883
  - Density: 175.8/km^{2} (455.3/sq mi)
- Time zone: UTC+01:00 (CET)
  - Summer (DST): UTC+02:00 (CEST)
- INSEE/Postal code: 63470 /63530
- ^{1} French Land Register data, which excludes lakes, ponds, glaciers > 1 km^{2} (0.386 sq mi or 247 acres) and river estuaries.

Volvic (French pronunciation: [vɔlˈvik]) is a commune in the Puy-de-Dôme department in Auvergne in central France.

The church at Volvic is dedicated to "St Priest" (Projectus), who is reputed to have been killed here in 676 AD.

== Population ==
Historical population
Year	Pop.	±% p.a.
1968	3,030	—
1975	3,253	+1.02%
1982	3,587	+1.41%
1990	3,930	+1.15%
1999	4,202	+0.75%
2007	4,606	+1.15%
2012	4,462	−0.63%
2017	4,487	+0.11%
2023	4,883	+1.42%
Source: INSEE

== International relations ==
Volvic is twinned with:

- Unterschneidheim, Germany
- Kirriemuir, Angus, Scotland

== Gallery ==
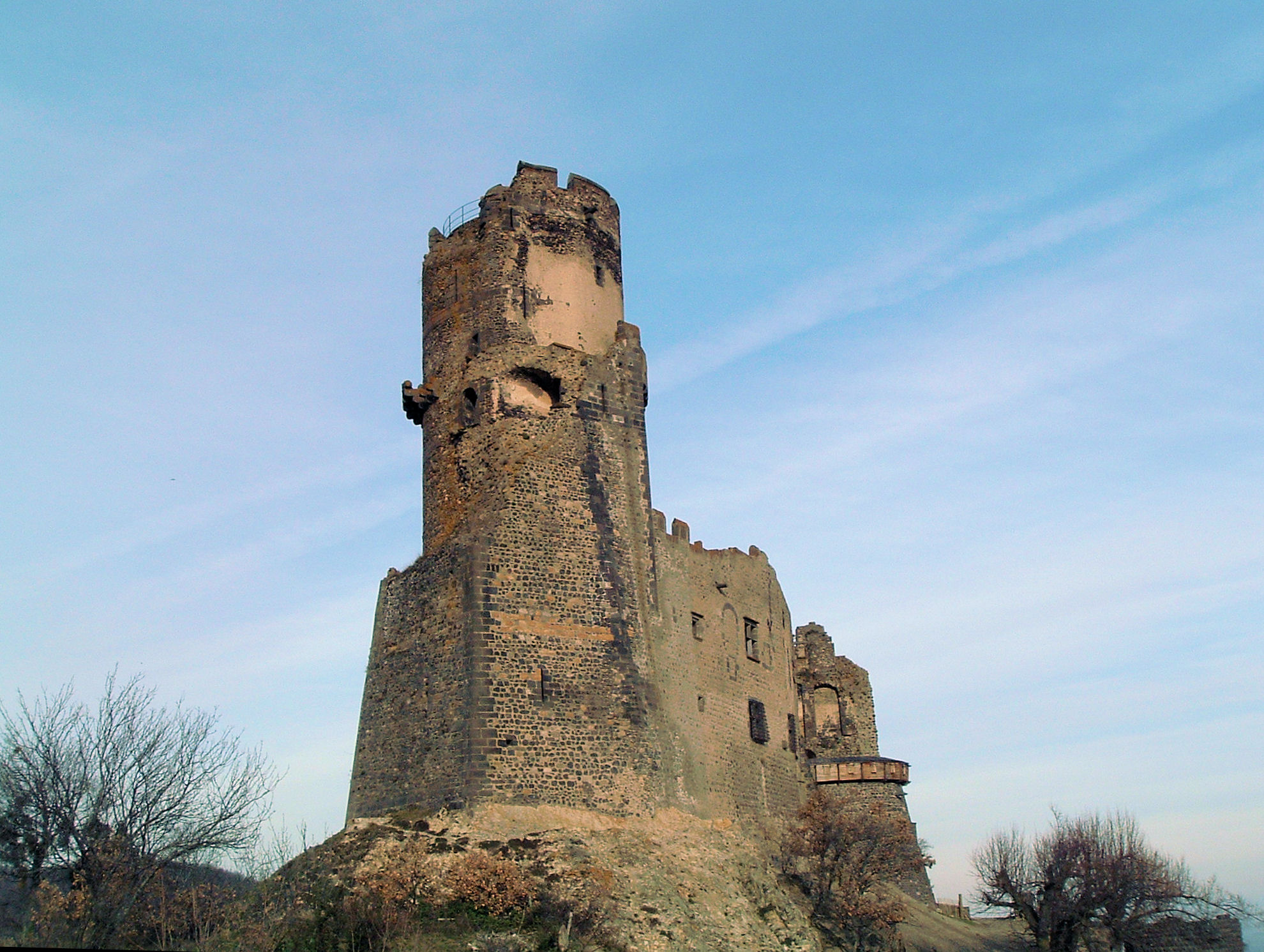
Château de Tournoël in Volvic

== See also ==
- Égaules
- Communes of the Puy-de-Dôme department
