= Égaules =

- Hamlet
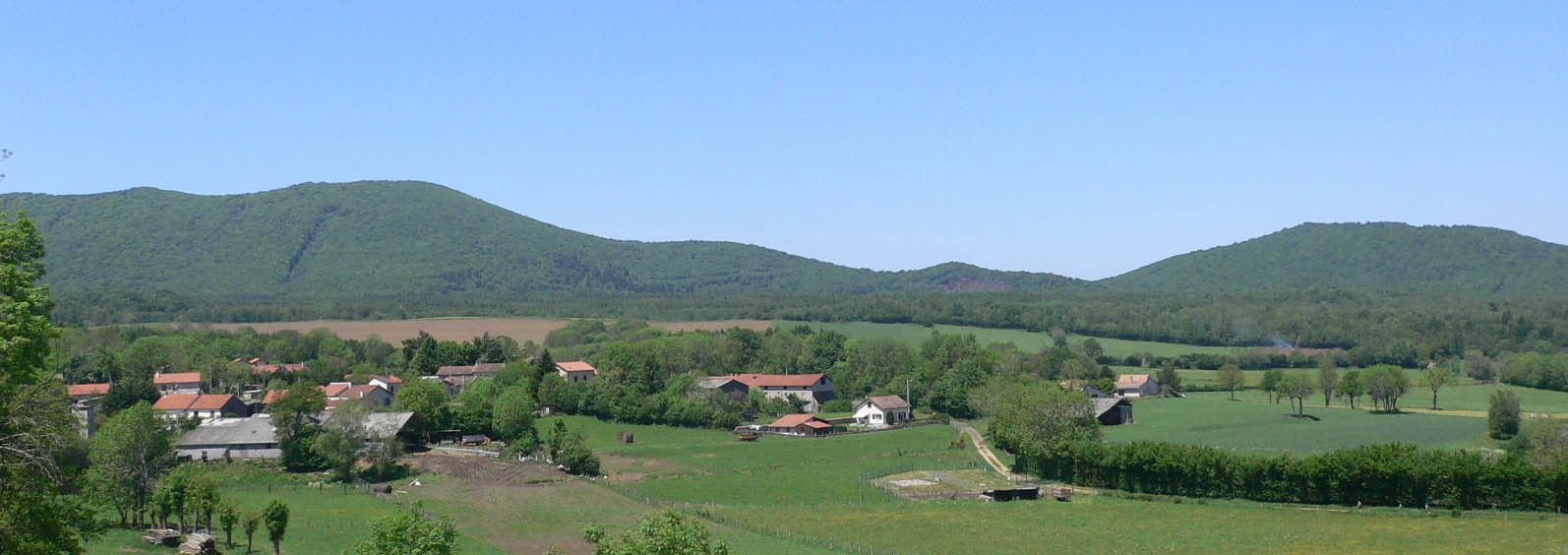
- A general view of Égaules

- Location in Auvergne-Rhône-Alpes
- Coordinates: 45°50′16″N 3°00′17″E
- Country: France
- Region: Auvergne-Rhône-Alpes
- Department: Puy-de-Dôme
- Arrondissement: Riom
- Commune: Volvic
- Elevation: 800 m (2,600 ft)
- Time zone: UTC+1 (CET)
  - Summer (DST): UTC+2 (CEST)

Égaules (French pronunciation: [eɡol]) is a small hamlet, part of the Volvic commune in Puy-de-Dôme département, in Auvergne, France.

It is situated at an altitude of 800 m upon a spur, where the thalweg is incised at 666 m above sea level. It sits at the junction of two lava flows: one originating from the eastern base of the Petit-Sarcouy, flowing from southwest to northeast, and the other from the Puy de Jume. The hydrographic basin of the Puy de la Nugère is also located nearby.

== Aerial incident ==
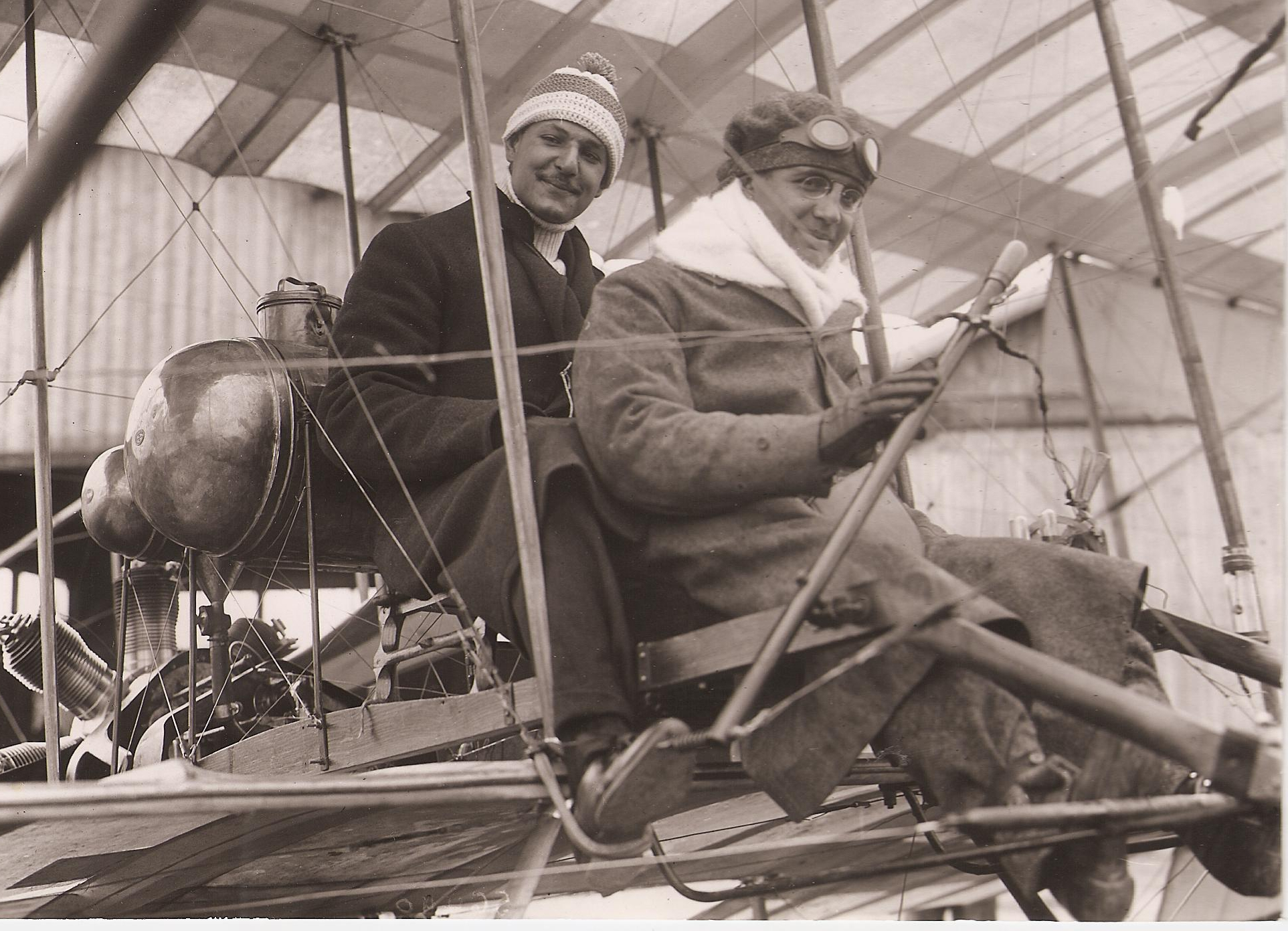
Weymann and Fay before their departure.

Égaules is notably the site of a forced landing by aviation pioneer Charles Weymann, accompanied by Manuel Fay.

On September 8, 1910, while attempting to win the Michelin Aviation Prize, which challenged aviators to fly from Paris to the summit of the Puy de Dôme in under six hours, Weymann was forced to land at Égaules due to rain and fog shortly before reaching his destination. The expedition was considered a remarkable achievement at the time, praised in the specialized aviation press and reported in the daily newspapers.
