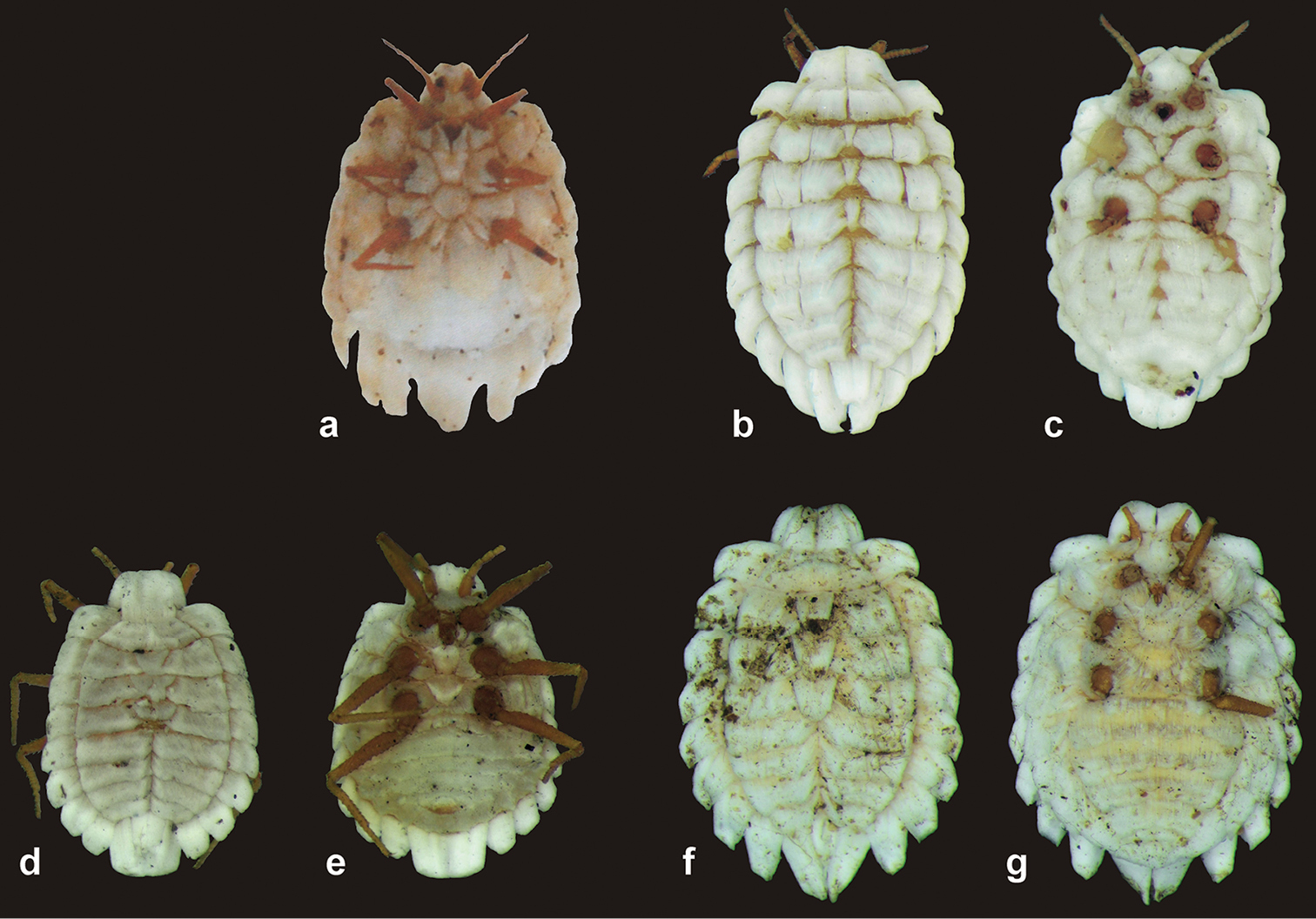
- Adult female specimens of Arctorthezia cataphracta

Scientific classification
- Domain: Eukaryota
- Kingdom: Animalia
- Phylum: Arthropoda
- Class: Insecta
- Order: Hemiptera
- Suborder: Sternorrhyncha
- Family: Ortheziidae
- Genus: Arctorthezia; Cockerell, 1902

= Arctorthezia =

Genus of true bugs

Arctorthezia is a genus of true bugs belonging to the family Ortheziidae.

The genus was first described by Cockerell in 1902.

The species of this genus are found in Europe and Northern America.

== Species ==
- Arctorthezia antiqua Koteja & Zak-Ogaza 1988
- Arctorthezia cataphracta (Olafsen 1772)
- Arctorthezia occidentalis (Douglas 1891)
- Arctorthezia pseudoccidentalis Morrison 1925
- Arctorthezia vardziae Hadzibejli 1963
