= Genesius (bishop of Clermont) =

French saint and bishop

Saint Genesius of Clermont
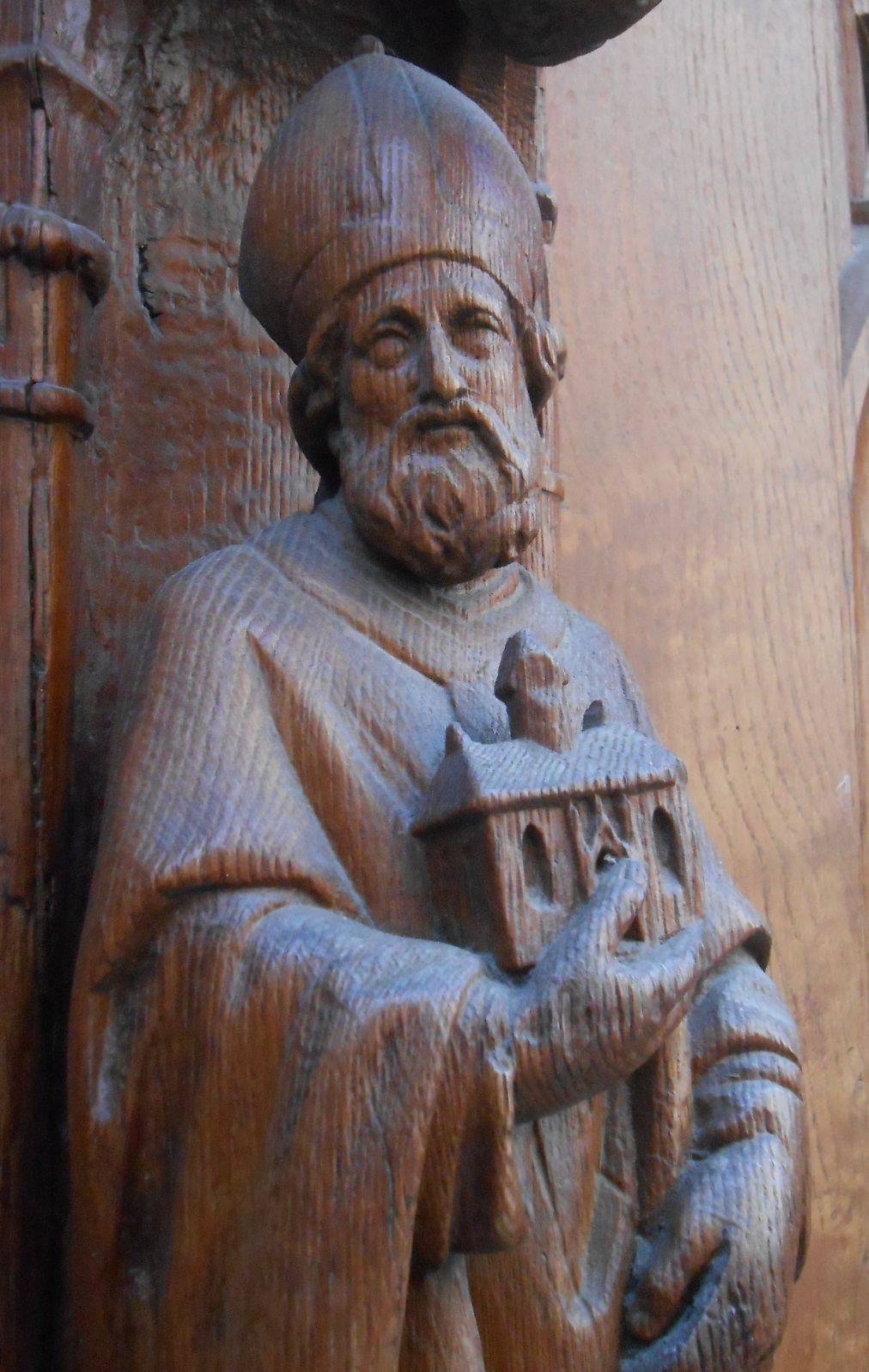
- Born: unknown
- Died: circa 662
- Venerated in: Roman Catholic Church
- Feast: June 3

Saint Genesius (died circa 662) is a French saint. He was the twenty-first Bishop of Clermont and his feast day is celebrated on June 3.

== Narrative ==
A legend, which is of a rather late date (Acta SS., June, I, 315), says that he was descended from a senatorial family of Auvergne. Having received a liberal education he renounced his worldly prospects for the service of the Church, became archdeacon of Clermont under Bishop Proculus. The parents of Saint Prix entrusted his education to Bishop Genesius.

Despite his protests, Genesius succeeded Proculus in the episcopacy in 656. Genesius (locally known as Saint Genes) was a prelate of austere piety and wholly devoted to his flock.

He laboured earnestly for the maintenance of Christian morality, and founded a hospital at Clermont and also the Abbey of Manlieu. After serving as bishop for five years, fearing for his own soul, he left Clermont secretly and went to Rome in the garb of a pilgrim. The bereaved flock sent a deputation to the Holy See. Genesius was found and induced to return.

Genesius then proceeded to build a monastery at Chantoin, a church and a hospice. He was buried in the church which he had built at Clermont in honour of St. Symphorian, and which later took his own name. In the life of Praejectus (Prix), Genesius is mentioned as one of the protectors of his childhood.

Genesius died about 662 in the seventh year of his Episcopate.

== Sources ==
- Dictionary of Saints, John J. Delaney, 2003.
