= Bernard Haussoullier =

French Hellenist, epigrapher and archaeologist (1852-1926)

Bernard Haussoullier (12 September 1852, Paris – 25 July 1926, Saint-Prix) was a French Hellenist, epigrapher and archaeologist.

== Biography ==
A student of the École normale supérieure and member of the French School at Athens (1876-1880), Bernard Haussoullier carried out a mission in Crete in 1878–1879 where he identified two new fragments of the Gortyn code.

A lecturer at the Faculty of Arts of Caen (1880-1883), a substitute teacher at the University of Bordeaux, he became a lecturer at the École pratique des hautes études for Greek antiquities in 1885. Director the Revue de philologie, de littérature et d'histoire anciennes, he directed the excavations of the temple of Apollo in Didyma with Emmanuel Pontremoli from 1891 to 1896.

A friend of Jean-Vincent Scheil, he edited the Bronze osselet offered as a votive gift to Apollo didymien by two people of Miletus, osselet which was caught up as a war prize by Darius and found at Susa. Moreover, Bernard Haussoullier, collaborated with American researchers to study Lydian inscriptions and Harald Ingholdt to study the Greek inscriptions of Syria.

He was elected a member of the Académie des Inscriptions et Belles-Lettres in 1905.

== Works ==
- 1879: Inscriptions de Chios, in Bulletin de correspondance hellénique
- 1884: Quomodo sepulcra Tanagraei decoraverint
- 1886: Le Dème d'Éleusis
- 1888–1891 and 1896–1903 La Vie municipale en Attique. Essai sur l’organisation des dèmes au IVe siècle, 2 vols
- 1891–1904 Recueil des inscriptions juridiques grecques, with Georges Mathieu, 2 vols
- 1896: Grèce, Collection des guides Joanne
- 1904: Didymes. Fouilles de 1895 à 1896, with E. Pontremoli
- 1905: Études sur l'histoire de Milet et du Didyméion
- 1909 Rapport sur les travaux des Écoles d'Athènes et de Rome en 1908
- 1917: Traité entre Delphes et Pellana

== Bibliography ==
- J-B. Chabot, Éloge funèbre de M. Bernard Haussoulier, Comptes rendus de l'Académie des inscriptions et belles-lettres, 1926
- E. Chatelain, Bernar Haussoullier, Revue de philologie N° 50, 1926
- Eve Gran-Aymerich, Les chercheurs de passé, Éditions du CNRS, 2007, p. 860
