= Meneleus of Menat =

French Monk

Saint Meneleus Abbot of Ménat
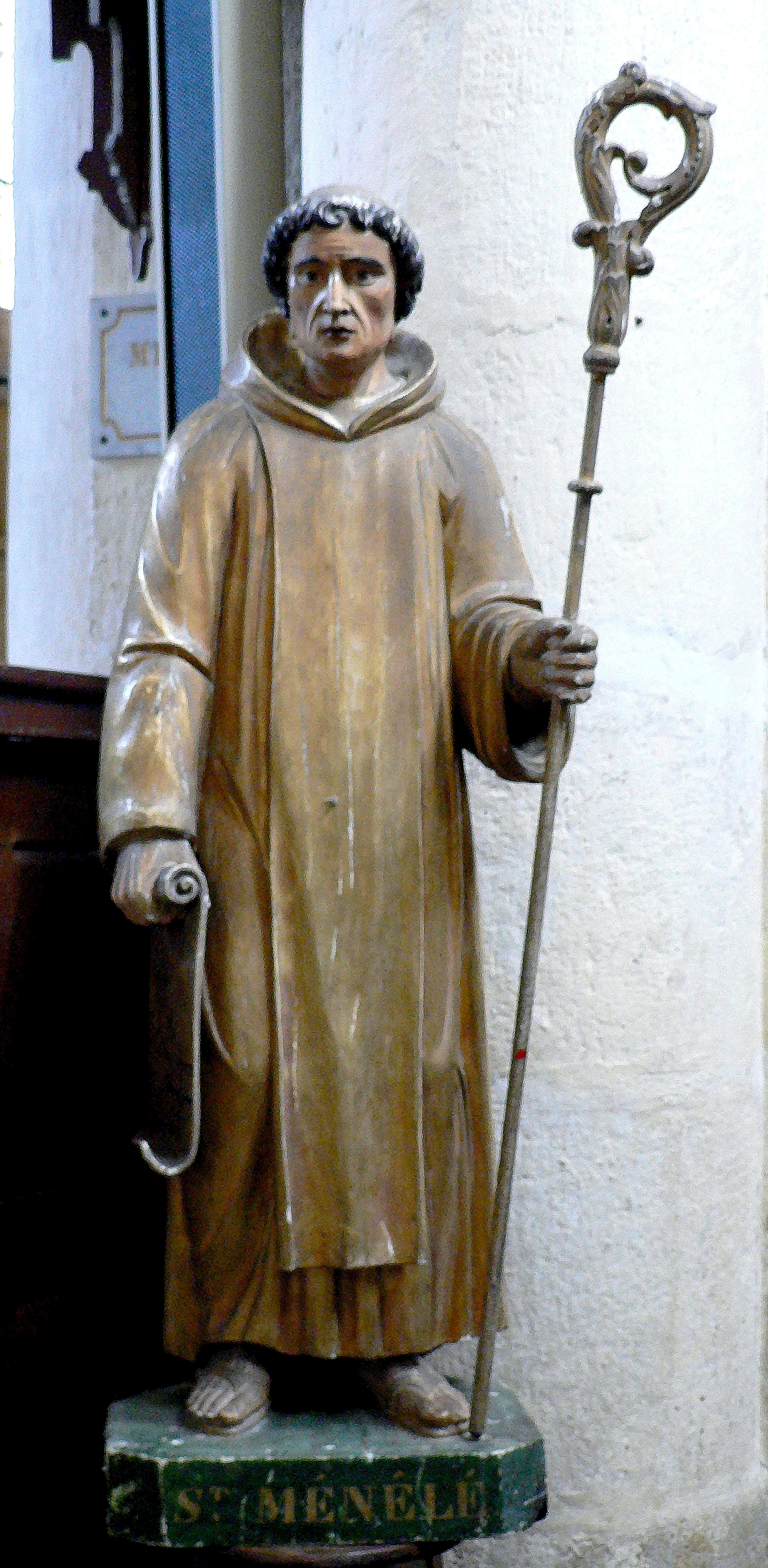
- Statue of Saint Meneleus in the Menat abbey church
- Born: Anjou
- Died: 720; Menat Abbey

Saint Meneleus (or Mauvier, Menele, Meneve, Menevius, Ménélée; died 720) was a French monk who founded the Menat Abbey.

== 12th-century sources ==
According to the 12th-century Vita Menelei and Vita S. Theofredi, Meneleus was descended from the Roman emperor Heraclius. He fled from home to avoid a marriage and met Theofredus, abbot of Saint-Chaffre. Meneleus entered this monastery and was trained by the abbot for several years. An angel then directed him to return to the spot where he had met Theofredus, where he fell asleep below an oak. The angel reappeared and told him to build a monastery on the spot, which became Menat Abbey. His female relatives could not live without him, and after a desperate search found him at Menat. A cella was built for them 6 kilometres (3.7 mi) away, with the church of Sainte-Marie of Lisseul.

== Monks of Ramsgate accounts ==
The monks of St Augustine's Abbey, Ramsgate wrote in their Book of Saints (1921),

Meneleus (Meneve) (St.) Abbot. (July 22)
(8th century) In French the name is rendered Menele or Mauvier. He was a native of the West of France, but entered a monastery in Auvergne. Later, he founded a great Abbey at Menat near Clermont. In his declining years he appointed as his successor Saint Savinien, a companion of his youth, and died A.D. 720.

Menevius (St.) Abbot. (July 22)
(8th cent.) A French Abbot in Auvergne, in which Province and in that of Anjou, in which he was born, he is in great veneration.

== Butler's account ==
The hagiographer Alban Butler (1710–1773) wrote in his Lives of the Fathers, Martyrs, and Other Principal Saints under April 12,

Saint Meneve, Abbot. He was born in Anjou, of a family allied to the Emperor Charlemagne. From his infancy it was his only ambition to serve Christ with his whole heart. When he was of an age to be settled in the world, his parents obliged him to accept a ring sent him by a great lord of the country, named Baronte, as a token that he would marry his daughter; but to prevent this engagement he fled into Auvergne, and there received the monastic habit at the hands of Saint Chaffre, or Theofrede, who was then œconome of the monastery of Carmery or Cormeri, so called from its founder, Carmen, duke of that country, since called Saint Theofrede's or Chaffre's monastery, in Auvergne, four leagues from Puy, in Velay, whom he had met at Menat, and followed to this abbey. Here he lived seven years, under the holy Abbot Eudo; then returned to Menat, seven leagues from Clermont: this monastery he built in such a manner as to have borne the name of its founder. He governed it for many years with great sanctity, and died in 720. He is honoured with singular veneration in Auvergne and Anjou, and mentioned by Usuard on the 22nd of July.

== Sources ==
- Butler, Alban (1799), The Lives of the Primitive Fathers, Martyrs, and Other Principal Saints, J. Moir This article incorporates text from this source, which is in the public domain.
- Remensnyder, Amy Goodrich (1995), Remembering Kings Past: Monastic Foundation Legends in Medieval Southern France, Cornell University Press, ISBN 0801429544
- St. Augustine's Abbey, Ramsgate (1921), The Book of saints : a dictionary of servants of God canonized by the Catholic Church, London: A. & C. Black, ltd. This article incorporates text from this source, which is in the public domain.
