= Praejectus =

7th-century Christian martyr

Saint Praejectus
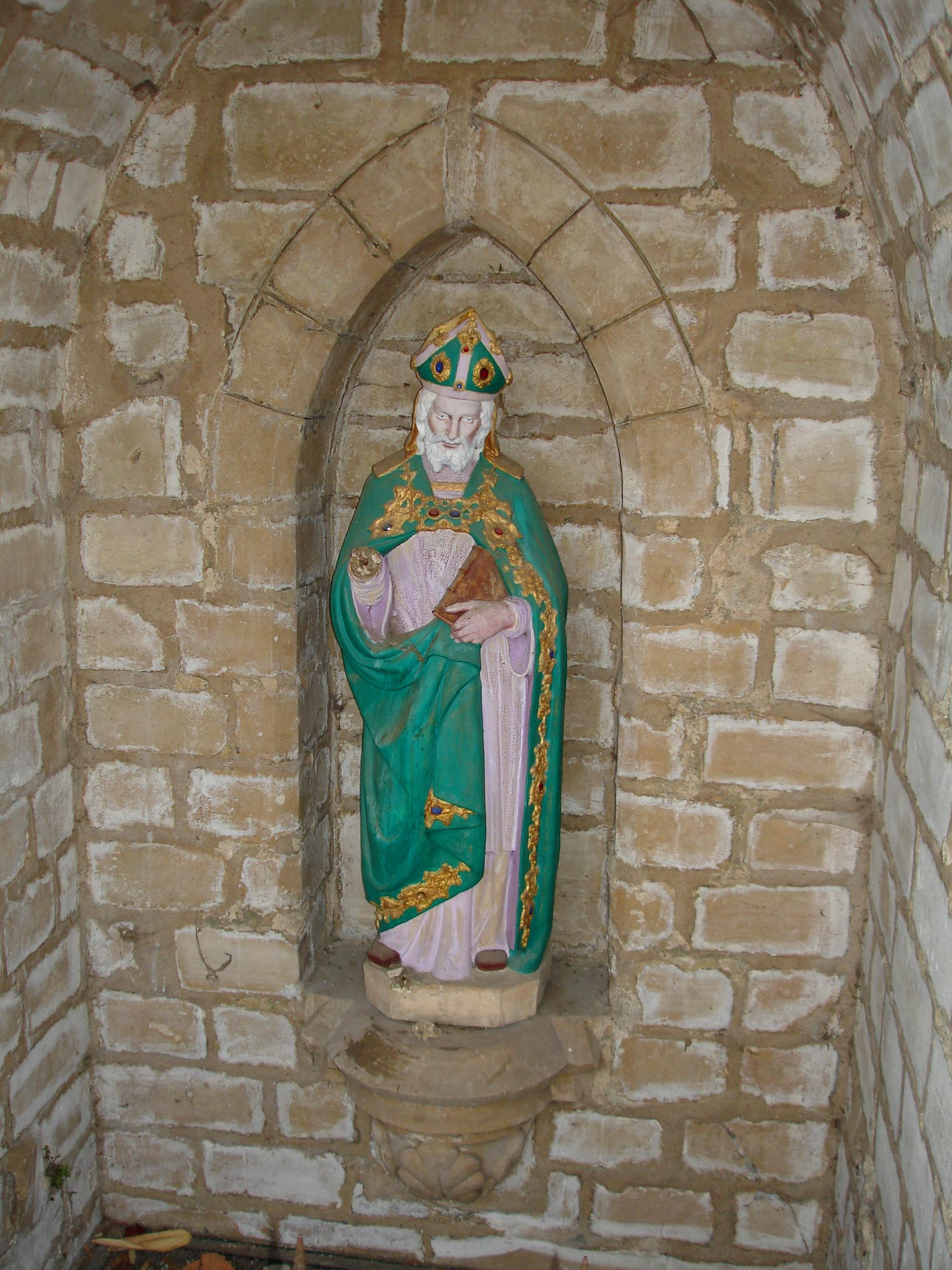
- Statue of Saint Prejectus (Pry) at Saint-Prix, Val-d'Oise.

Martyr
- Born: Auvergne
- Died: January 25, 676; Volvic
- Venerated in: Eastern Orthodox Church; Roman Catholic Church
- Major shrine: In 760, his relics were enshrined at Flavigny Abbey, where most relics remain; other relics elsewhere.
- Feast: January 25

Praejectus, Prejectus, or Projectus (French: Saint Pry, Prie, Prix, Priest, Prest, Preils) (Italian: Preietto, Proietto) (625–676) was a bishop of Clermont, who was killed together with the abbot Amarinus as a result of contemporary political struggles.

== Life ==
Born in the Auvergne to Gundolenus, of the lesser nobility; he studied under Bishop Genesius of Clermont. He was ordained a priest and placed in charge of the church at Issoire. Bishop Felix appointed him abbot of the monastery at Chantoin, founded by Genesius.

Upon the death of Felix, Praejectus unsuccessfully contested the succession with the archdeacon Garivaldus, however, Garivaldus died shortly after becoming bishop. When the bishopric of Clermont became vacant, King Childeric sent edicts to elect Genesius, Count of Clermont, probably a relative of the late bishop. However, the Count stepped down, concerned that his appointment might be contrary to canon law.

With the approval of Childeric II, Praejectus became bishop of Clermont in 666. Partly through generosity of Count Genesius, Praejectus founded monasteries, hospitals, and churches. In 675, a land dispute between Praejectus and Hector, lord of Marseille, was heard at the royal court in Autun. Hector was the son-in-law of Count Genesuis; the dispute was over certain bequests.

Hector, who had fallen out with Wulfoald, the Mayor of the palace of Austrasia, was accused of various crimes, and at the order of Childeric, arrested and executed. Agritius, the man who killed Praejectus, believed that the bishop had been responsible for Hector’s death. At Volvic, the assassin thus stabbed to death Praejectus and Amarinus, abbot of a monastery in the area.

The death of Praejectus was linked to that of Leger (Leodegarius). Leger was an opponent of Ebroin, mayor of the palace of Neustria on two occasions; firstly from 658 to his deposition in 673 and secondly from 675 to his death in 680 or 681. In a violent and despotic career, he strove to impose the authority of Neustria, which was under his control, over Burgundy and Austrasia. Ebroin's supporters, which included Praejectus, Reol of Rheims, Agilbert of Paris, and Ouen of Rouen, held a council of bishops that sat in judgment on Leger, at Marly, near Paris. Praejectus' murderer may have been a supporter of Leger, who was later murdered on October 2, 679.

== Veneration ==
An account of Praejectus' life was written shortly after his death and he was immediately venerated as a martyr. The account was written perhaps by 690, as it was written during the lifetime of St. Avitus II of Clermont.

The author may have been a nun from the monastery of Chamalières. Chamalières was a monastery founded through Praejectus' efforts, and it was presided over by an abbess who was probably a member of Praejectus' family. The author may also have been a monk from Volvic or Saint-Amarin.

During the time of Charlemagne, Abbot Manasses of Flavigny Abbey transferred from Volvic to Flavigny the relics of Praejectus.

His cultus spread to English monastic calendars. The church at Volvic, where Praejectus was killed, is dedicated to "St Priest" (Projectus). In 1278, some of his relics (a finger) were translated to the town of Saint-Prix (Val-d'Oise).

The valley of Saint-Amarin was named after Amarinus.

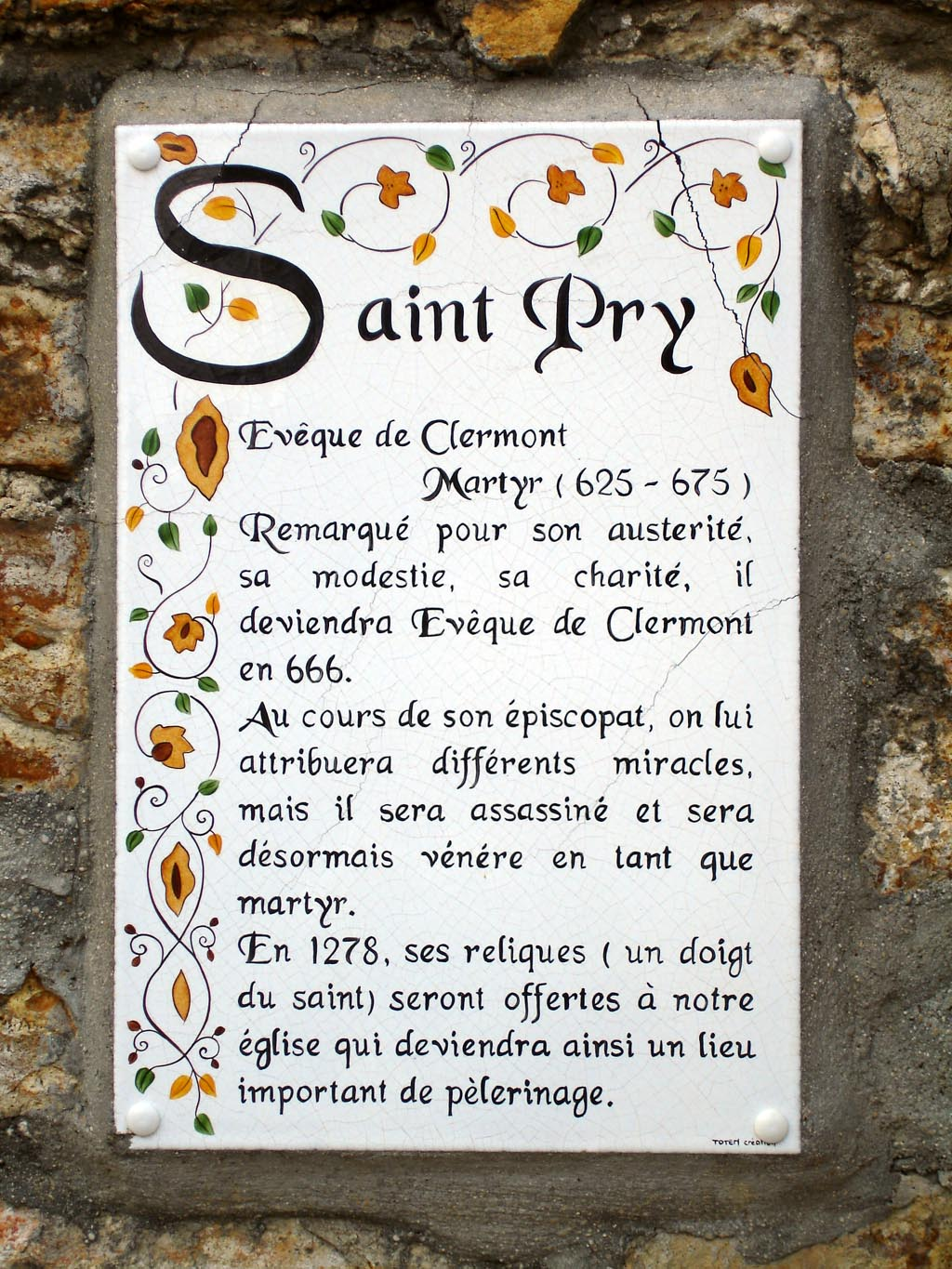
Commemorative plaque at Saint-Prix, Val d'Oise.

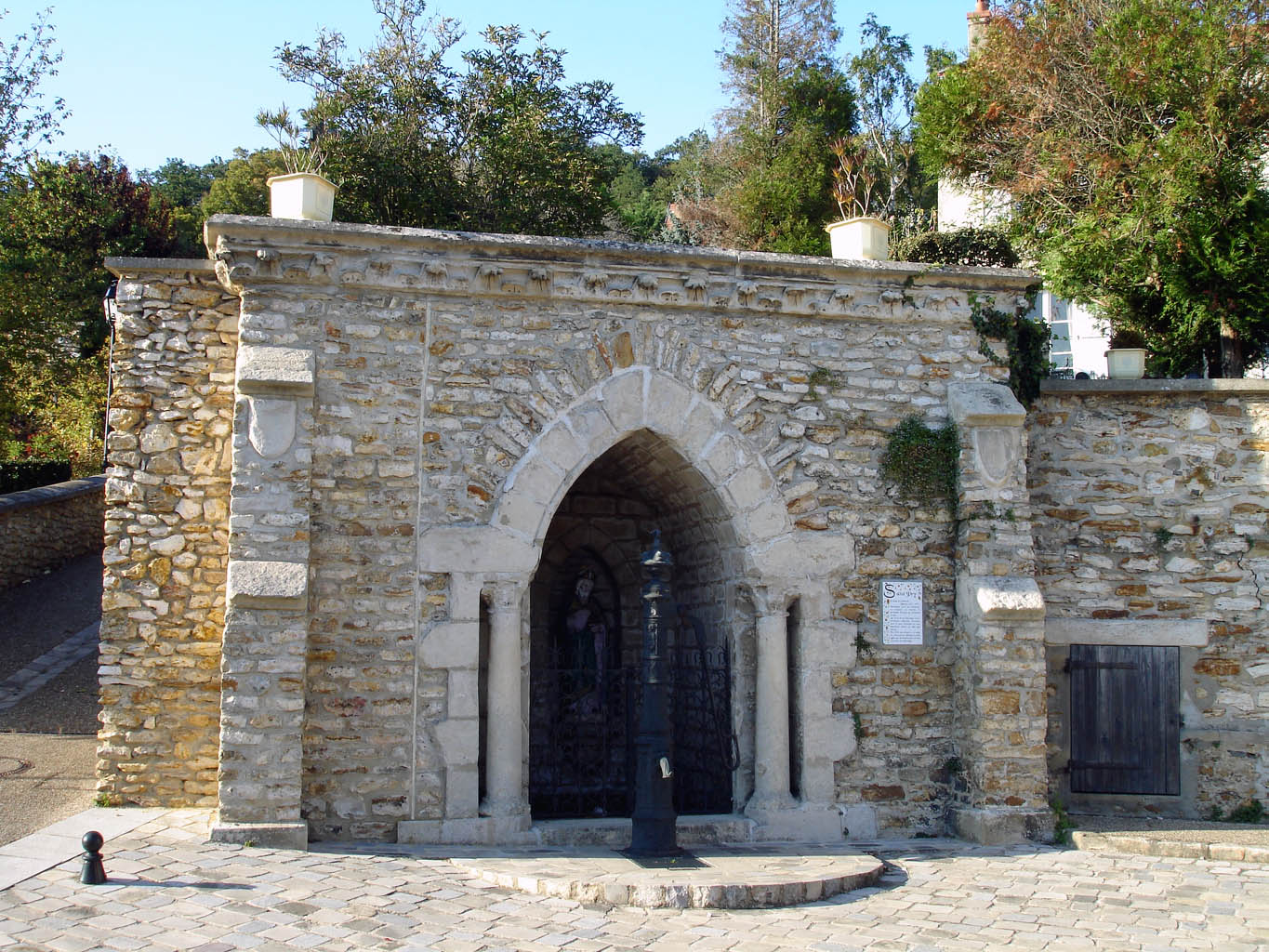
Fountain of Saint Pry (Projectus), Saint-Prix, Val d'Oise.
