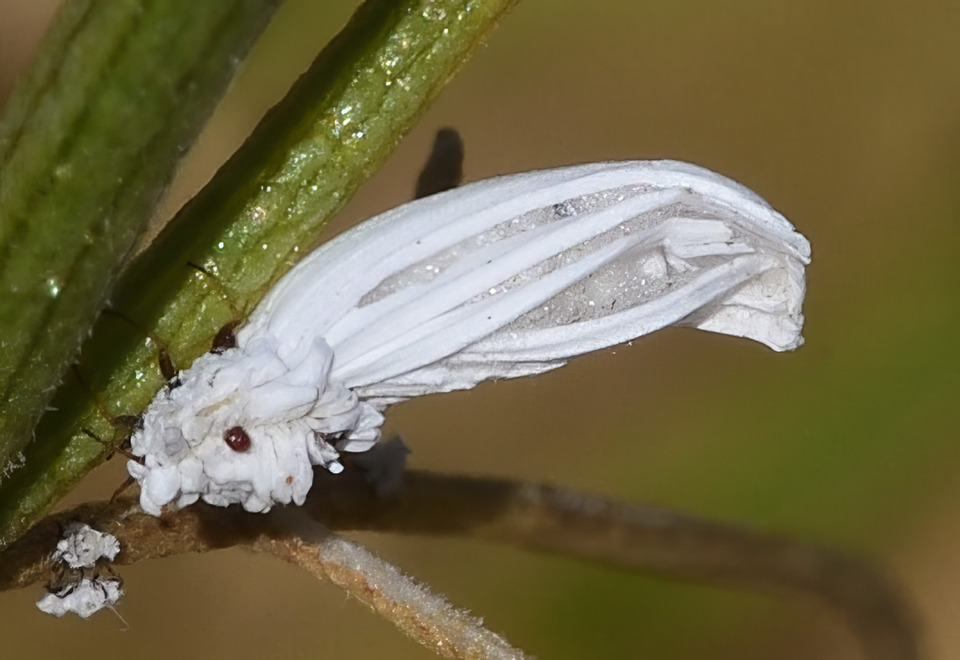
- Orthezia annae

Scientific classification
- Kingdom: Animalia
- Phylum: Arthropoda
- Clade: Pancrustacea
- Class: Insecta
- Order: Hemiptera
- Suborder: Sternorrhyncha
- Family: Ortheziidae
- Genus: Orthezia; Bosc d'Antic, 1784

= Orthezia =

Genus of true bugs

Orthezia is a genus of true bugs belonging to the family Ortheziidae.

The species of this genus are found in Eurasia and North America.

Species:

- Orthezia ambrosicola Morrison, 1952
- Orthezia annae Cockerell, 1893
- Orthezia argrimoniae Shinji, 1936
- Orthezia boliviana Morrison, 1925
- Orthezia cheilanthi Tinsley, 1898
- Orthezia graminicola Morrison, 1952
- Orthezia grandis Hempel, 1920
- Orthezia japonica Kuwana, 1917
- Orthezia juniperi Morrison, 1952
- Orthezia lasiorum Cockerell, 1901
- Orthezia maroccana Kozár & Konczné Benedicty, 2004
- Orthezia newcomeri Morrison, 1952
- Orthezia nuda Ferris, 1919
- Orthezia olivacea Cockerell, 1905
- Orthezia quadrua Ferris, 1950
- Orthezia sclerotica Morrison, 1952
- Orthezia selaginellae Morrison, 1952
- Orthezia shirakensis Hadzibejli, 1963
- Orthezia solidaginis Sanders, 1904
- Orthezia sonorensis Cockerell, 1896
- Orthezia tartallyi Konczné Benedicty & Kozár, 2004
- Orthezia urticae (Linnaeus, 1758)
- Orthezia yashushii Kuwana, 1923
