= Saint-Prix, Val-d'Oise =

Saint-Prix
- Commune
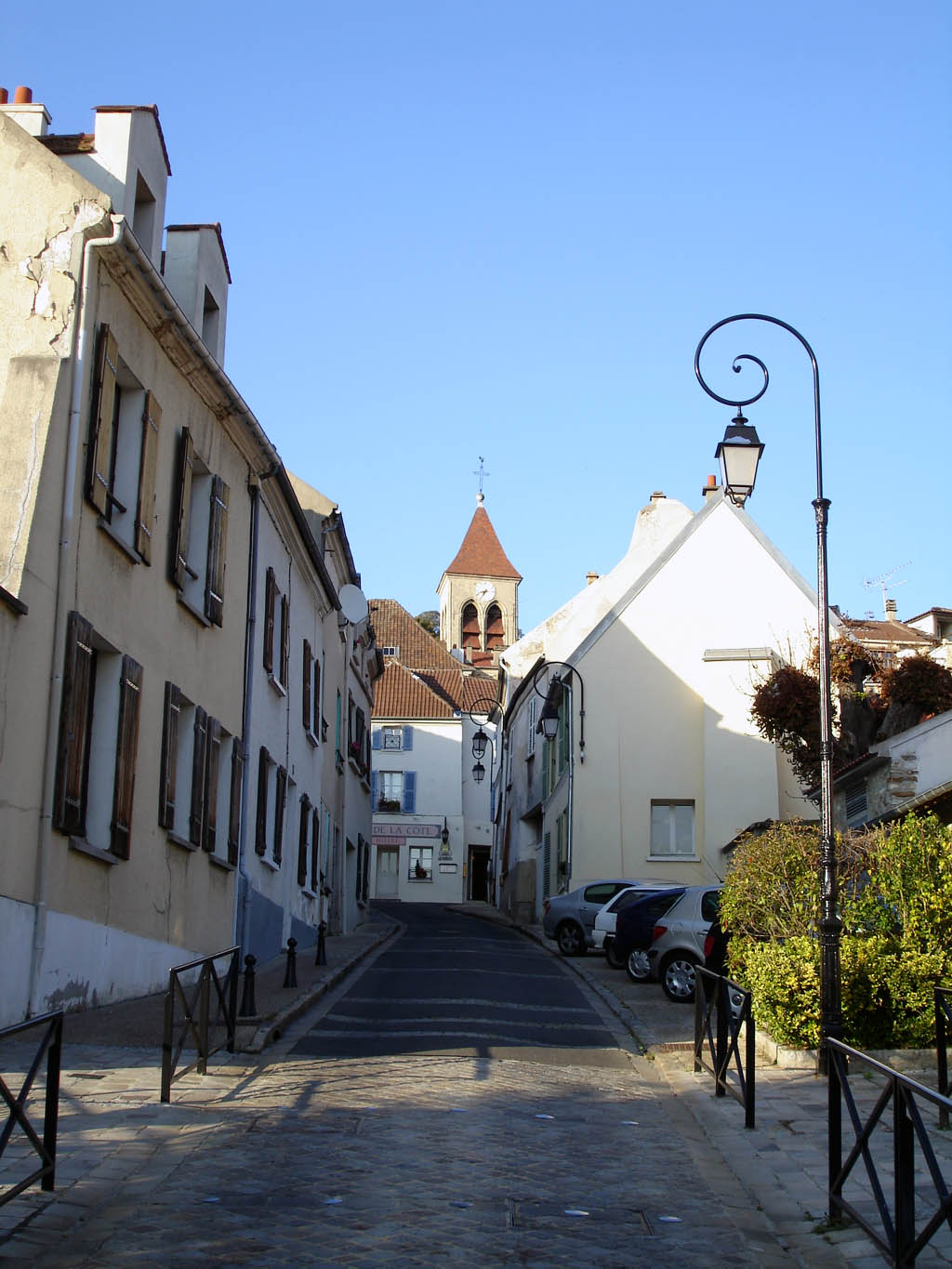
- The Rue de Rubelles, in Saint-Prix

- Coat of arms
- Location of Saint-Prix
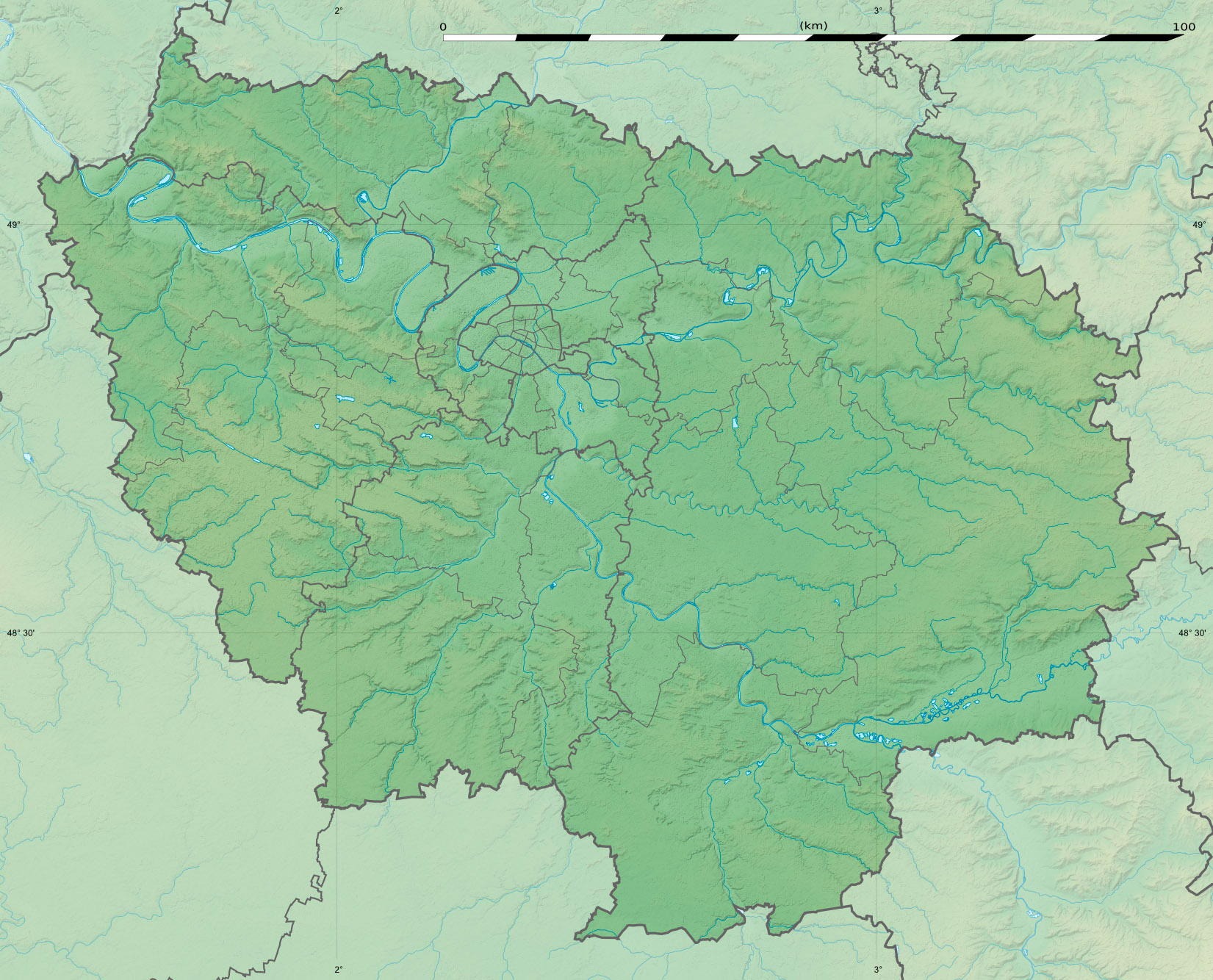
- Location within France Location within Île-de-France (region)
- Coordinates: 49°00′58″N 2°16′00″E
- Country: France
- Region: Île-de-France
- Department: Val-d'Oise
- Arrondissement: Sarcelles
- Canton: Domont
- Intercommunality: CA Plaine Vallée

Government
  - Mayor (2020–2026): Céline Villecourt
- Area^{1}: 7.93 km^{2} (3.06 sq mi)
- Highest elevation: 193 m (633 ft)
- Lowest elevation: 57 m (187 ft)
- Population (2023): 7,612
  - Density: 960/km^{2} (2,490/sq mi)
- Time zone: UTC+01:00 (CET)
  - Summer (DST): UTC+02:00 (CEST)
- INSEE/Postal code: 95574 /95390
- ^{1} French Land Register data, which excludes lakes, ponds, glaciers > 1 km^{2} (0.386 sq mi or 247 acres) and river estuaries.

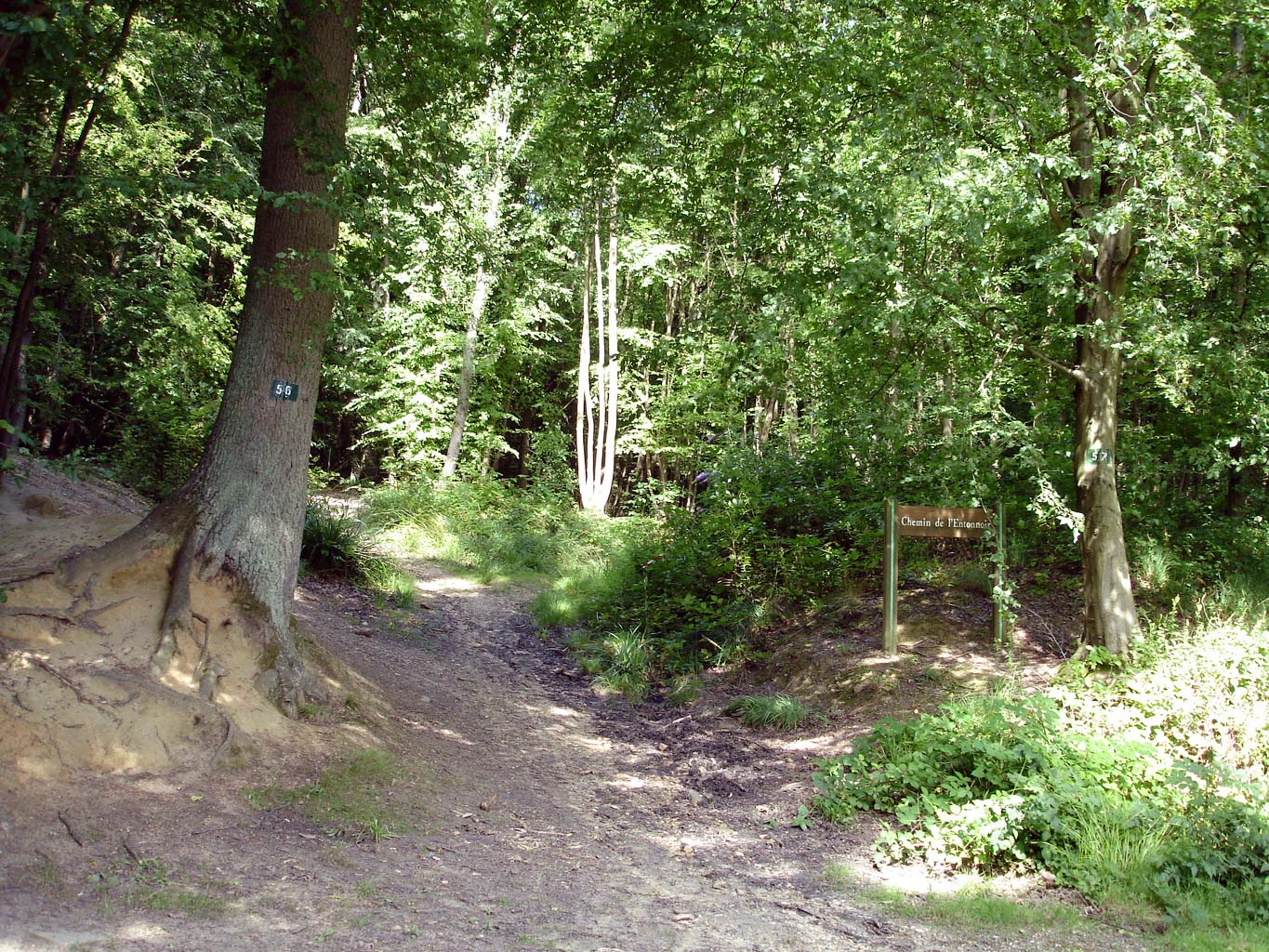
The "Chemin de l'Entonnoir" in the forest of Montmorency.

Saint-Prix (French pronunciation: [sɛ̃ pʁi]) is a French commune located in the Val-d'Oise department, in the Île-de-France region.

Its inhabitants are called Saint-Prissians.

The commune is located 15 km to the north of Paris, on the southern flank of the vast butte-témoin bearing the forest of Montmorency. It overlooks the Montmorency valley.

The Hellenist, epigrapher and archaeologist Bernard Haussoullier (1852–1926) died in Saint-Prix.

== Etymology ==
Attested as Turnus in 1175, Tour or Tourn, To or Torn in 1193, Tou in 1648, Thou in 1691.

Formerly "Thor" or "Thür", of Germanic origin (compare Thor), the village owes its current name to the Auvergne saint Praejectus martyred in 676 AD, whose relics were deposited in a priory established by monks who had received them from Jean de Tour, treasurer of the Temple of Paris. Pilgrimages to the relics of Saint-Prix thence progressed, and the name "Saint-Prix" appears in 1536.

== Population ==
Historical population
Year	Pop.	±% p.a.
1968	4,302	—
1975	5,435	+3.40%
1982	4,981	−1.24%
1990	5,623	+1.53%
1999	6,767	+2.08%
2007	7,245	+0.86%
2012	7,214	−0.09%
2017	7,158	−0.16%
2023	7,612	+1.03%
Source: INSEE

== See also ==
- Communes of the Val-d'Oise department
