= Menat Abbey =

Abbey in Menat, France

- Abbaye clunisienne de Menat
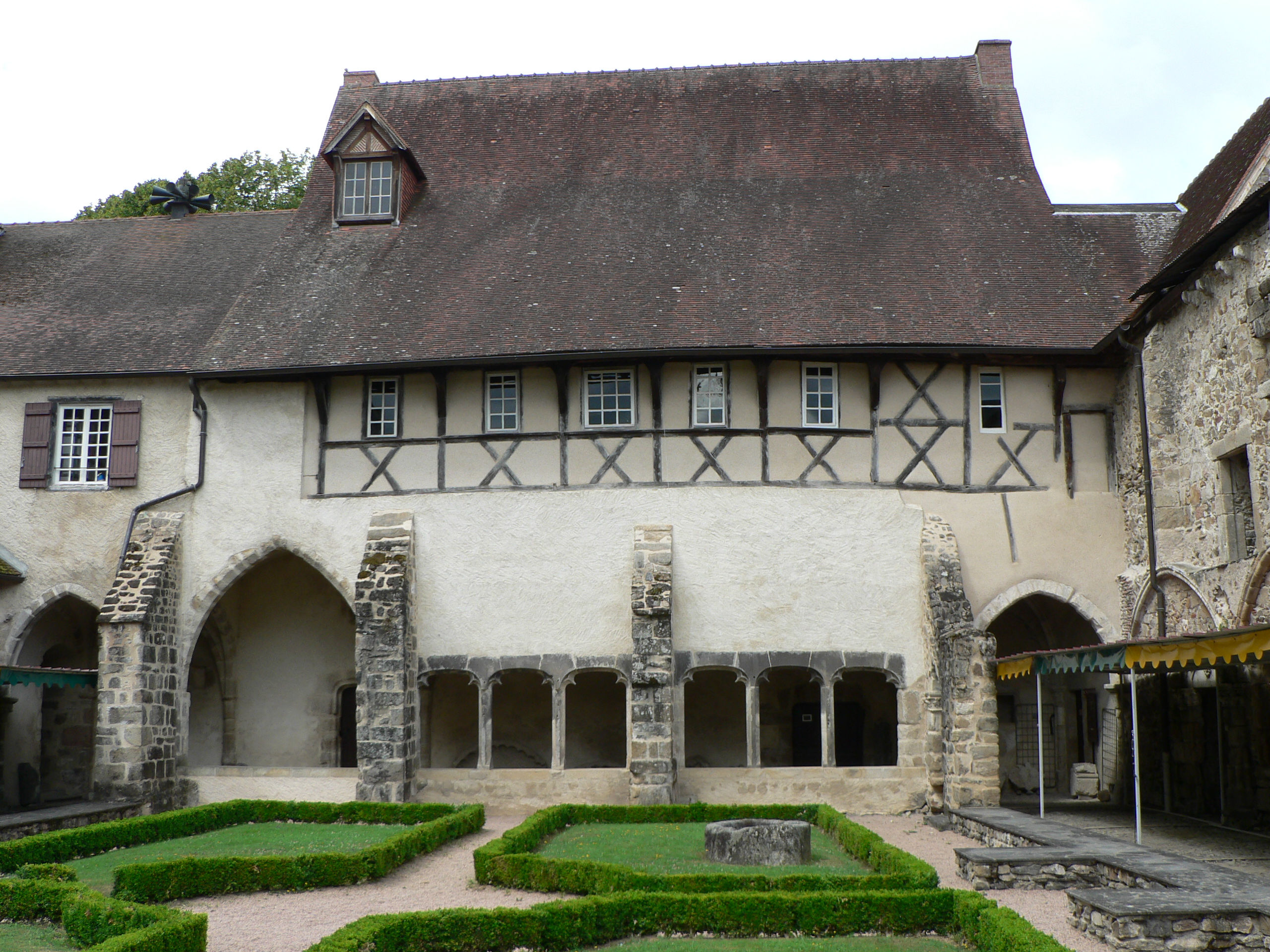
- Cloister of Menat abbey and abbey house

- Location within France

Monastery information
- Denomination: Cluniac Reforms

Architecture
- Heritage designation: Classé MH 1977; Inscrit MH 2015
- Style: Romanesque, Gothic
- Groundbreaking: 11th century
- Completed date: 15th century

Site
- Location: Menat, Puy-de-Dôme, Auvergne-Rhône-Alpes
- Country: France
- Coordinates: 46.10396°N 2.9045°E

Menat Abbey (French: Abbaye de Menat) is an abbey located in the village of Menat, Puy-de-Dôme, in the heart of the Sioule valley. It is one of the oldest monastic foundations in Auvergne.

== History ==
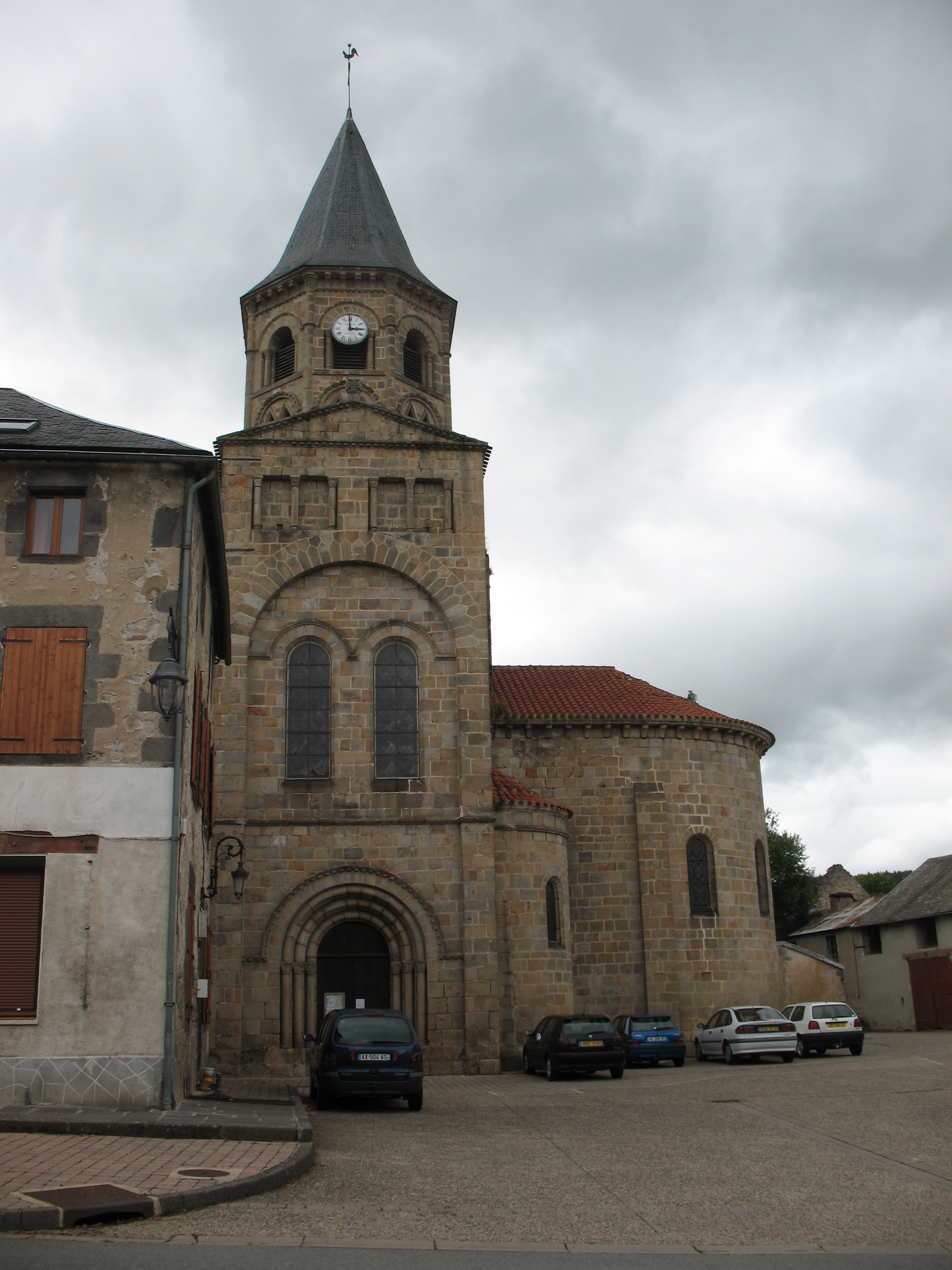
The old abbey, today the parish church

Ruined, it was rebuilt and reformed at the end of the 7th century by Meneleus of Menat, who came from Anjou to flee his parents who wanted to arrange a marriage for him. Later attached to the powerful Cluny Abbey, it became one of the centers of monastic reform in Auvergne. Many parishes depended on the monastery and it received income from them, including tithes. Its dependencies included Notre-Dame in Montluçon, Saint-Sulpice in Villebret, Abbaye Notre-Dame de Bellaigue in Virlet and Saint-Bonnet in Sussat. The wealthy priory had a large church in the Romanesque period. It was subsequently fortified to face the bands of brigands who pillaged and destroyed the country.

The abbey became in commendam in 1628. On the eve of the French Revolution, it was in full decline and on the verge of ruin. It was sold as national property in the Revolution and the church was desecrated. In 1802, the abbey church was returned to worship and became the parish church of Menat.

The classification as a historical monument took place in 1977. It was supplemented by an inscription in 2015.

== Description ==
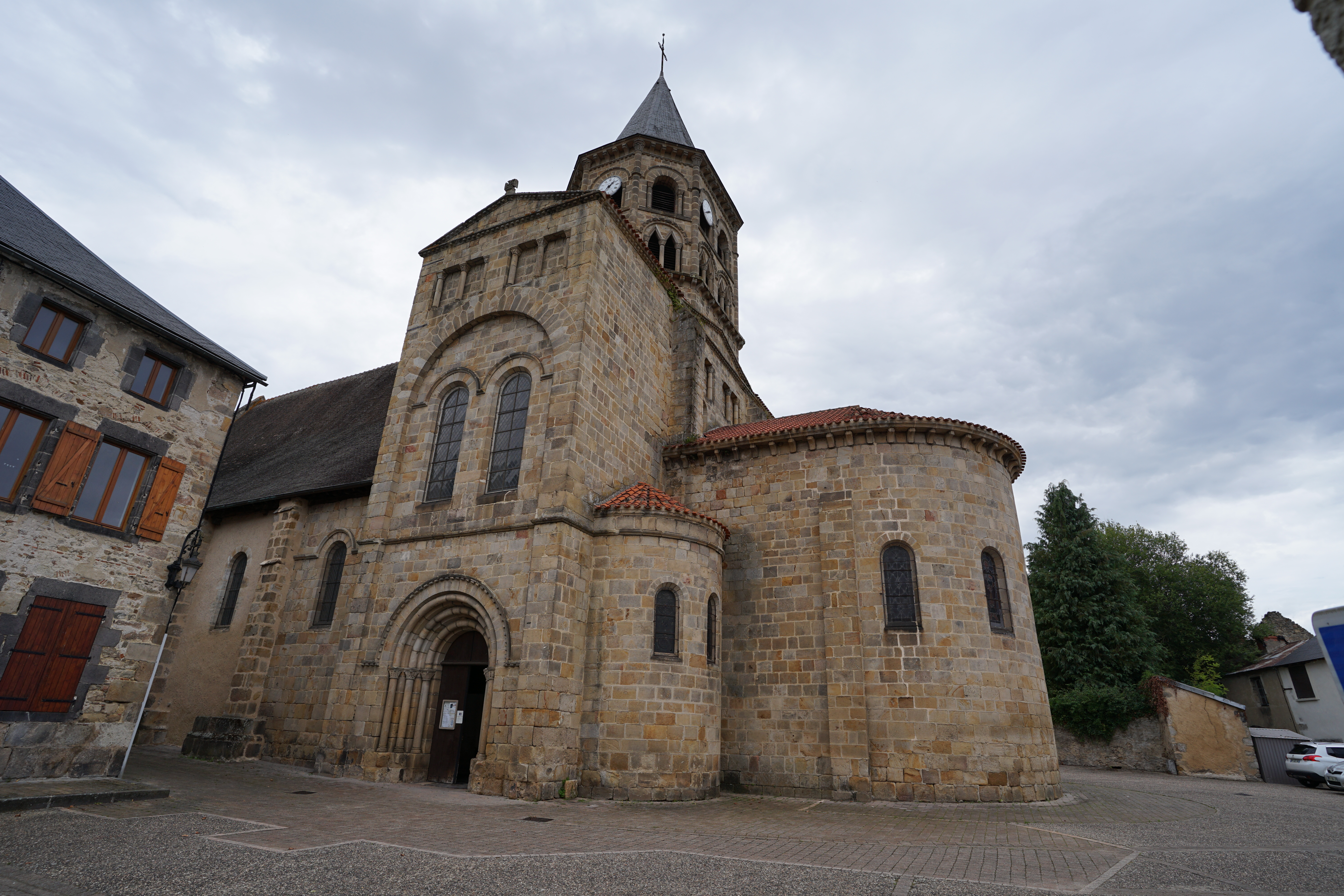
The abbey as seen from the direction of the D18

The monastic complex includes a Romanesque abbey, a cloister and convent buildings. The monastery was fortified, as can still be seen from the west turret. Sold during the Revolution, the abbey suffered a lot of destruction. The fortified apse was razed and replaced by a more modest and simple apse.

The cloister rested on the church to the south, the abbey dwelling to the west, the kitchen and refectory to the north, the chapter house (with the dormitory on the first floor) to the east. The south, east and north galleries of the cloister have disappeared; only the west gallery remains attached to the abbey dwelling. The building housing the chapter hall collapsed in the second half of the 18th century.

The refectory, a large rectangular room with Gothic decor built in the fourteenth century, lost its roof, and its southern wall collapsed in 1987. But the remains of the painted decoration and the carved vaults can still be seen.

The abbey church preserves a magnificent carved bell tower, a Romanesque portal and another multi-lobed portal. In the nave, a capital, used as a baptismal font, represents the legend of Ménélée, the patron saint of the monastery.

A paleontological museum has been set up in part of the abbey. On the first floor, there are 15th century murals, including a Roman calendar.

== Sources ==
- "Ancienne abbaye Saint-Ménelée", Base Mérimée (in French), Ministère français de la Culture
- Liste des immeubles protégés au titre des monuments historiques en 2015, Légifrance
- "Une peinture murale du xve siècle restaurée à Menat", La Montagne, 24 April 2003
