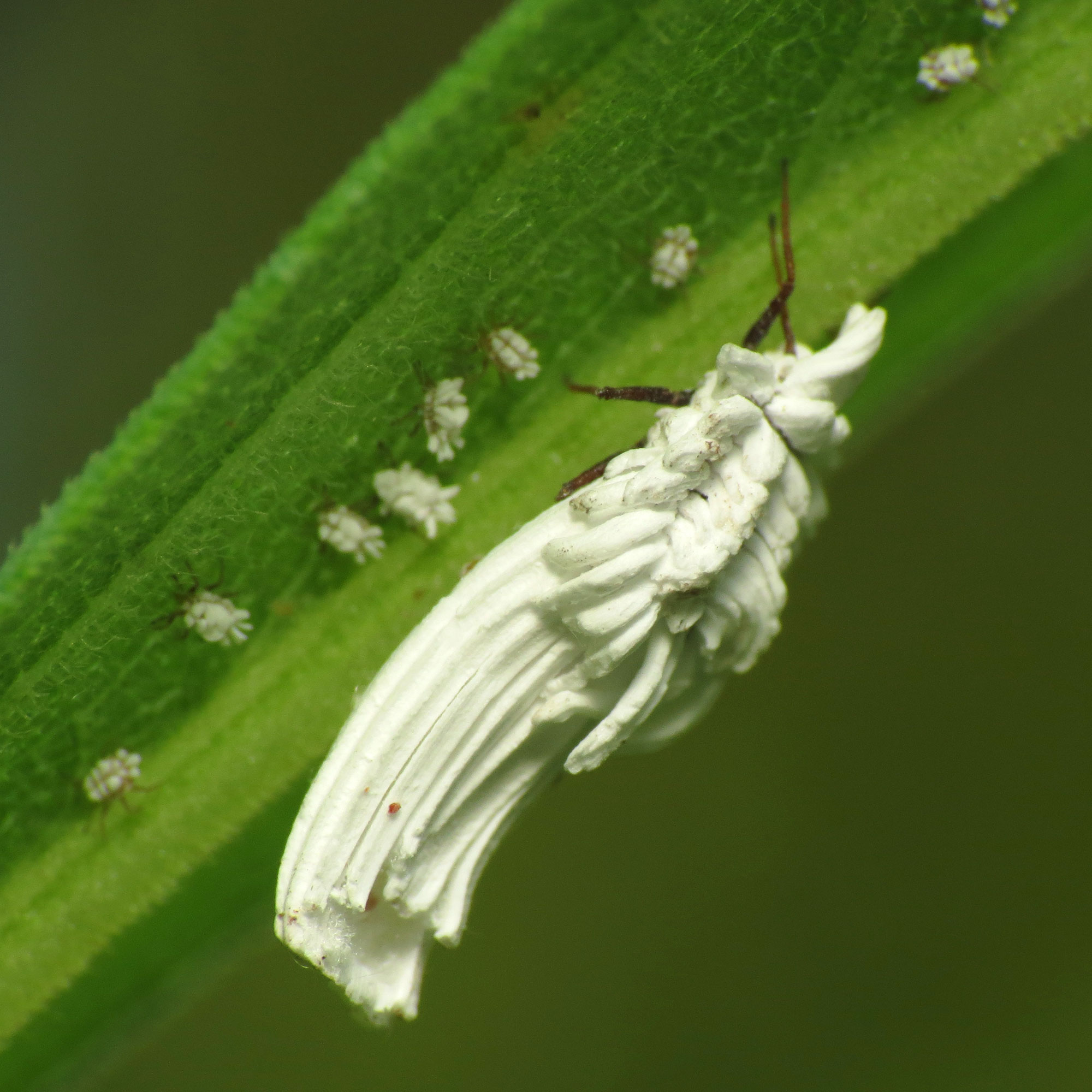
- Ortheziidae female and nymphs

Scientific classification
- Kingdom: Animalia
- Phylum: Arthropoda
- Clade: Pancrustacea
- Class: Insecta
- Order: Hemiptera
- Suborder: Sternorrhyncha
- Superfamily: Coccoidea
- Family: Ortheziidae; Amyot and Serville

Genera
- See text

= Ortheziidae =

Family of true bugs

Ortheziidae is a family of scale insects commonly known as the ensign scales or ortheziids. They occur in most parts of the world but the majority of the species are found in the Neotropical and Nearctic regions while there are not many species in Australasia and the Far East. There are twenty valid genera and 198 species.

== Hosts ==
Ensign scales are found on a wide range of host plants including mosses, grasses, small herbaceous plants, woody shrubs and even fungi.

== Description ==
Adult ensign scales have six dark coloured legs, a pair of dark antennae and stalked eyes. The apex of the antennae have thick terminal bristly setae. There are several abdominal spiracles and an anal ring on the dermal surface, with pores and setae. The upper surface of the body is covered in a thick waxy secretion giving it a decorated, fluted appearance.

== Life cycle ==
Ensign scales have four instars in the female and usually five instars in the male. The male penultimate and ultimate nymphal stages (prepupa and pupa) are mobile but non-feeding like adult males. The eggs are usually laid in an ovisac attached to the perimeter of the ventral abdomen by a band.

== Genera ==
- Acropygorthezia
- Arctorthezia
- Graminorthezia
- Insignorthezia
- Jermycoccus
- Matileortheziola
- Mixorthezia
- Neomixorthezia
- Neonipponorthezia
- Newsteadia
- Nipponorthezia
- Nipponorthezinella
- Orthezia
- Orthezinella
- Ortheziola
- Ortheziolacoccus
- Ortheziolamameti
- Palaeonewsteadia
- Praelongorthezia
