= Amma =

Amma or AMMA may refer to:

== Acronym ==
- Amhara Mass Media Agency (created in 1993), a media organisation in Amhara Region in Ethiopia
- All Malaysia Malayalee Association
- American Mask Manufacturers Association
- American Medical Marijuana Association
- Association of Malayalam Movie Artists
- Assistant Masters' and Mistresses' Association, former British trade union

== People ==
- Anasuya Devī (1923–1985), Indian spiritual guru
- J. Jayalalithaa (1948–2016), Former Chief Minister of Tamil Nadu
- Mata Amritanandamayi (born 1953), Indian spiritual guru known as "the hugging saint"
- Amma Sri Karunamayi (born 1958), Indian spiritual guru
- Amma Asante (born 1969), British screenwriter and director
- Amma Asante (born 1972), Dutch politician
- Kollakkayil Devaki Amma (born c. 1934), Indian forester
- Lauren Amma Keen, British singer-songwriter

== Film ==
- Amma (1949 film), a Sri Lankan film
- Amma (1952 film), an Indian Malayalam film
- Amma (1968 film), an Indian Kannada film
- Amma (1976 film), an Indian Malayalam film directed by M. Krishnan Nair
- Amma (1986 film), a 1986 Hindi-language Indian feature film
- Amma Rajinama, a 1991 Indian Telugu film directed by Dasari Narayana Rao
- Amma (2003 film), an Indian Hindi film
- Amma (2018 film), an Indian film

== Other ==
- Amma, Iran, a village in Ilam Province, Iran
- Amma, West Virginia, an unincorporated community in Roane County, West Virginia, US
- Amma (deity), the supreme creator according to the Dogon people of Mali
- Amma ("grandmother"), the ancestress of the freemen in Norse mythology; see Rígsþula
- Amma (TV series), a 2016 Hindi-language Indian crime drama television series

== See also ==
- Amman (disambiguation)
- Amah (disambiguation)
- Ama (disambiguation)
