= Ama =

Ama, ama, or AMA may refer to:

== People ==
- Ama (Ama Kōhei), former ring name for sumo wrestler Harumafuji Kōhei
- Āma, 8th-century Indian king
- Mary Ama, a New Zealand artist
- Shola Ama, a British singer
- Augustus Akinloye (1919–2007), a Nigerian politician
- Ama (musician), an English singer-songwriter, born 1998

== Places ==
- Ama, Aichi, a city in Japan
- Ama, Belgium, Walloon name of Amay village
- Ama, Estonia, a village in Kadrina Parish, Lääne-Viru County
- Ama, Gaiole in Chianti, a village in Tuscany, Italy
- Ama, Iran, a village in Ilam Province
- Ama, Louisiana, a town in the US
- Ama, Shimane, a town in Japan

== Language ==
- Ama language (New Guinea)
- Ama language (Sudan)
- American Manual Alphabet

== Arts, entertainment, and vehicles ==
=== Music ===
- Americana Music Association
- Australian Music Association, the Australian musical products trade association
- American Music Awards
- Aotearoa Music Awards, in New Zealand
- UK Asian Music Awards (UK AMA)
- Alte Mozart-Ausgabe

=== Other arts ===
- Ama (film), a 2021 Spanish drama film
- Academy of Magical Arts, magicians' association
- Academia Mexicana de Arquitectura, architectural academy in Mexico
- Art Museum of the Americas, Washington, DC, US
- Anime Mid-Atlantic, convention in Virginia, US
- Australian Muslim Artists, exhibition and art prize in Melbourne, Australia

=== Sports and transportation ===
- Agence Mondiale Antidopage, or World Anti-Doping Agency
- Academy of Model Aeronautics, United States
- American Motorcyclist Association
  - AMA Formula Xtreme
  - AMA Grand National Championship
  - AMA Motocross Championship
  - AMA Superbike Championship
  - AMA Supercross Championship
  - AMA Supersport Championship
- Alberta Motor Association, Canada
- Autoridad Metropolitana de Autobuses (Metropolitan Bus Authority), Puerto Rico
- Rick Husband Amarillo International Airport (IATA airport code AMA)
- Ama (sailing), an outrigger

== Business, computing, and engineering ==
- American Management Association
- American Marketing Association
- Advanced measurement approach to financial operational risk
- Automatic message accounting of phone bills
- Advanced Manageability Alliance, of Intel and IBM, introduced Wake-on-LAN technology
- AMA Computer University, the Philippines
  - AMA International University, Bahrain branch of AMA
- Actual mechanical advantage

== Medicine ==
- Against medical advice
- Antimitochondrial antibody

=== Medical organizations ===
- African Medicines Agency
- Alberta Medical Association
- American Medical Association
- Argentine Medical Association
- Australian Medical Association

== Other uses ==
- Ama (ayurveda), anything incompletely transformed
- Ama (diving), Japanese divers
- Ama (given name), a feminine given name of the Akan people
- Ama (title) of Samoan chief in Safata
- Accra Metropolitan Assembly, administrative authority for Accra, Ghana
- Ama Museum, Taiwan
- American Missionary Association
- Asociación de Mujeres Antifascistas, Second Spanish Republic
- Augusta Military Academy, Fort Defiance, Virginia, US
- Veterans Appeals Improvement and Modernization Act of 2017, US legislation
- "Ask Me Anything" on subreddit /r/IAmA

== See also ==
- Amma (disambiguation)
- Amah (disambiguation)
