= Amas =

Amas or AMAS may refer to:

- Amas Musical Theatre, in New York
- AMAS Awards, Spanish music awards
- American Music Awards (AMAs)
- Academy of Machinima Arts and Sciences
- Amas, Bihar, a village in Gaya district, Bihar, India

== People with the name ==
- Knut Olav Åmås (born 1968), Norwegian writer and politician
- Michele Amas (1961–2016), New Zealand actress, playwright and poet
- Amas Daniel (born 1990), Nigerian wrestler

== See also ==
- Ama (disambiguation)
- Amahs (disambiguation)
- Ammas
