= Ayat (disambiguation) =

Ayat is Arabic plural of ayah, the smallest unit of the Qur'an it may also refer to

== People ==
=== Given name ===
- Ayat (rapper), rapper based in Accra, Ghana
- Ayat al-Akhras, suicide bomber from Palestine
- Ayat Al-Qurmezi (born 1991), poet from Bahrain

=== Surname ===
- Albert Ayat (1875–1935), French fencer
- Félix Ayat (1882–1972), French fencer, brother of Albert

== Places ==
- Ayat (river), in Kazakhstan and Russia
- Ayat-sur-Sioule, commune in central France
- Bni Ayat, town and rural commune in Morocco
- Ayat (restaurant), restaurant chain in New York and New Jersey, U.S.

== Other ==
- Ayat an-Nur, the 35th verse of the 24th sura of the Qur'an
- Ayat (band), black metal band based in Beirut, Lebanon
- Ayat (Dune), term for "the signs of life" in the fictional universe of Dune
- Ayat-Ayat Cinta, Indonesian drama film
  - Ayat-Ayat Cinta, the novel on which the film is based
- Aayat (song), a song from the soundtrack of Bajirao Mastani

== See also ==
- Ayah (disambiguation)
- Ayats, a Spanish coachbuilder
