= Louis Desaix =

French general (1768–1800)

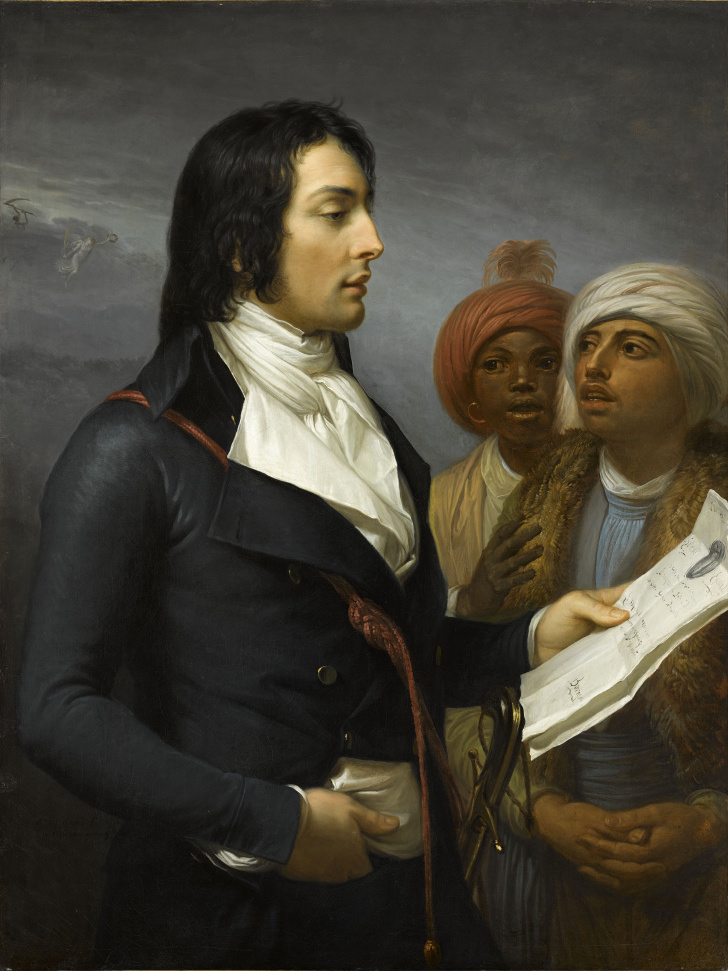
- Portrait by Andrea Appiani, 1800
- Born: 17 August 1768; Ayat-sur-Sioule, Kingdom of France
- Died: 14 June 1800 (aged 31) Spinetta Marengo, Kingdom of Sardinia
- Allegiance: Kingdom of France; Kingdom of the French; French First Republic
- Branch: Army
- Service years: 1783–1800
- Rank: Divisional general
- Conflicts: French Revolutionary Wars; Battle of Wissembourg; Battle of Maudach; Battle of Rastatt; Battle of Neresheim; Siege of Kehl; War of the Second Coalition; Battle of the Pyramids; Battle of Marengo †

Louis Charles Antoine Desaix (French: [lwi ʃaʁl ɑ̃twan dəzɛ]) (17 August 1768 – 14 June 1800) was a French general and military leader during the French Revolutionary Wars. According to the usage of the time, he took the surname Desaix de Veygoux. He was considered one of the greatest generals of the Revolutionary Wars.

== Biography ==
Desaix was born to a noble family in the Château d'Ayat in Ayat-sur-Sioule, in the province of Auvergne, to Gilbert des Aix, Lord of Veygoux, the family manor in Charbonnières-les-Varennes, and Amable de Beaufranchet, his wife and first cousin. Desaix received his military education at the school founded by Marshal d'Effiat, and joined the French Royal Army. During his first six years of army service, he devoted himself to duty and to military studies. When the French Revolution broke out, he threw himself into the insurrectionist cause. Refusing to "emigrate", he joined the staff of Charles Louis Victor de Broglie, the Jacobin son of the duc de Broglie. This nearly cost Desaix his life, but he escaped the guillotine, and by his conspicuous service soon came into favor with the Republican government. Like many other members of the old ruling classes who had accepted the new order, the instinct of command joined to native ability, brought Desaix career success, and thus he had attained the command of a division in 1794.

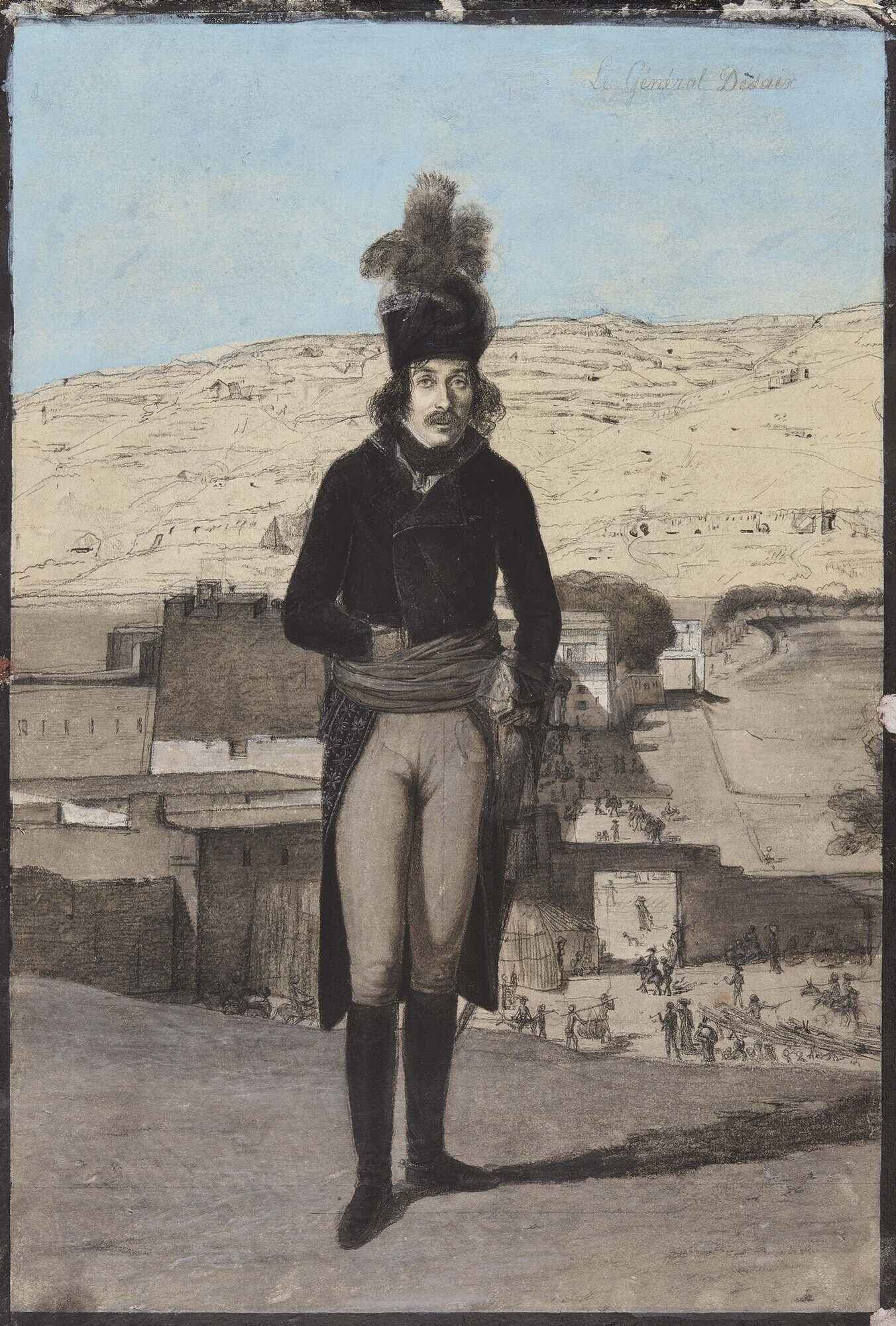
1798 portrait of Desaix in Egypt by André Dutertre

During the campaign of 1795 he commanded Jourdan's right-wing, and during Moreau's invasion of Bavaria, the following year, he held an equally important command. Following the retreat which ensued when the archduke Charles won the battles of Amberg and Würzburg, Desaix commanded Moreau's rearguard, and later the fortress of Kehl, with the highest distinction, and his name became a household word, like those of Bonaparte, Jourdan, Hoche, Marceau and Kléber. Next year his initial successes were interrupted by the Preliminaries of Leoben, and he procured for himself a mission into Italy in order to meet General Bonaparte, who spared no pains to captivate the brilliant young general from the almost rival camps of Germany. Provisionally appointed commander of the Army of England, Desaix was soon transferred by Bonaparte to the expeditionary force intended to invade Egypt. It was his division which bore the brunt of the Mamluk attack at the Battle of the Pyramids, and he crowned his reputation by his victories over Murad Bey in Upper Egypt. Amongst the fellaheen he acquired the significant appellation of the "Just Sultan".

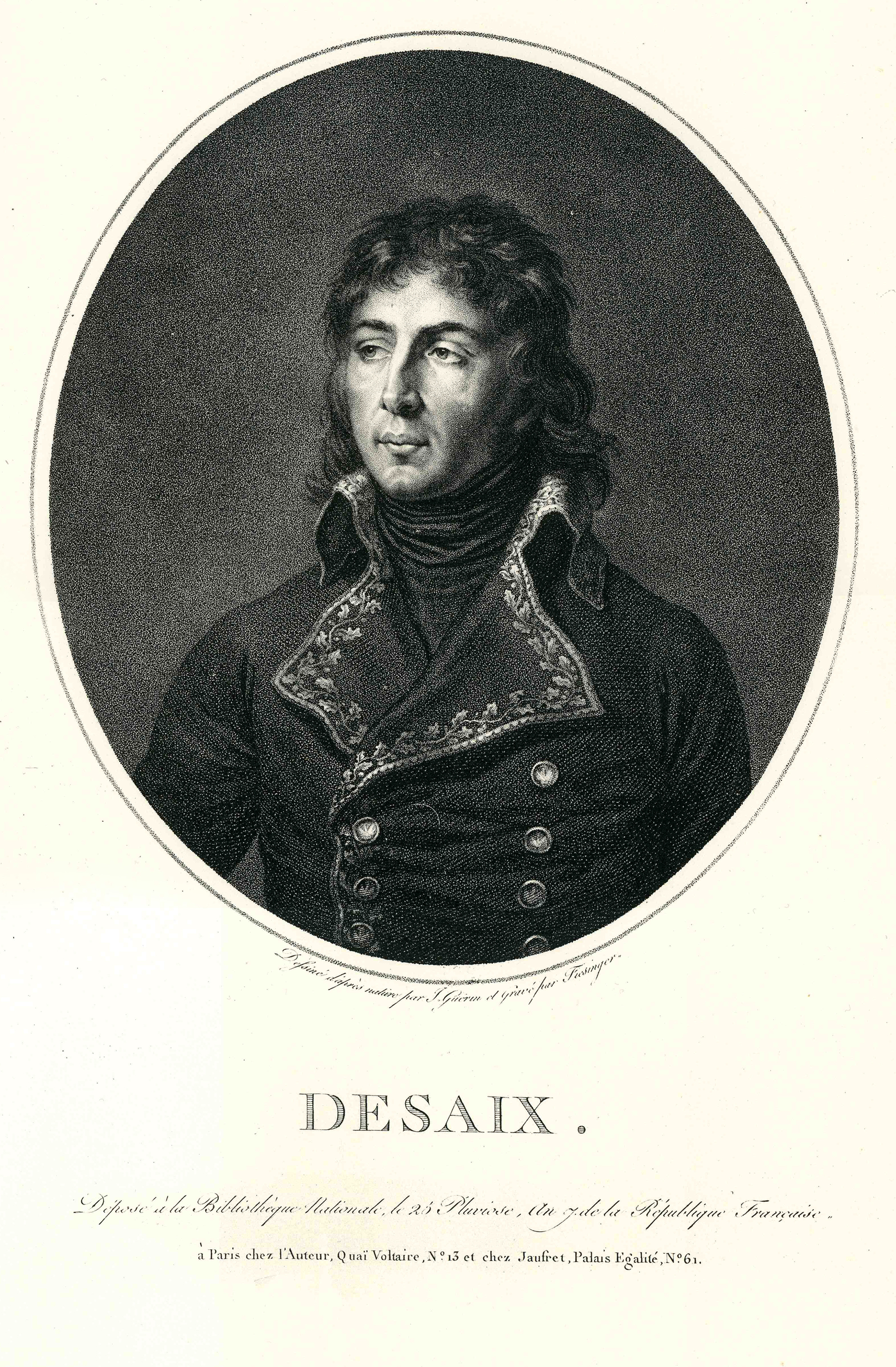
Engraving by Fiesinger of a portrait by Jean-Urbain Guérin, 1798

When command passed to Kléber, Desaix was one of a small party of French officers selected to accompany Bonaparte back to France. However, it was months before he could join the new First Consul. After being recalled from Upper Egypt, Desaix embarked on a ship which set sail for Europe on 3 March 1800. However, after the ship arrived in Livorno, the British Vice-Admiral of the Red Lord Keith declared Desaix to be a prisoner of war and detained him, refusing to recognise his status as a general. Desaix allegedly responded to Keith's decision by stating "I ask you nothing except to deliver me from your presence. If you wish, give straw to the wounded who are with me. I dealt with the Mamelukes, the Turks, the Arabs of the great Desert, the Ethiopians, the blacks of Darfur; all respected their word when they gave it, and they did not insult men in misfortune." Desaix was eventually let go as a result of superior orders from the British Admiralty.

The campaign of 1800 was close to its climax when Desaix arrived in Italy. He was immediately assigned to the command of a corps of two infantry divisions serving in the Army of Italy. Three days later (14 June), detached, with Boudet's division, at Rivalta, he heard the cannon of Marengo on his right. Taking the initiative he marched at once towards the sound, meeting Bonaparte's staff officer, who had come to recall him, halfway on the route. He arrived with Boudet's division at the moment when the Austrians were victorious all along the line. Exclaiming, "There is yet time to win another battle!" he led his three regiments straight against the enemy's center. At the moment of victory, Desaix was killed by a musket ball. On the same day, Jean-Baptiste Kleber, Desaix's good friend and comrade, and the governor-general of Egypt, was assassinated in Cairo. Upon hearing the news of Desaix's death, a grief-stricken Napoleon Bonaparte exclaimed, "Why am I not allowed to weep?"

== Memory ==
Napoleon paid tribute to Desaix by erecting monuments to him, one on the Place Dauphine and the other in the Place des Victoires in Paris. The memorial in the Place des Victoires was later destroyed. A monumental tomb with sculptures by Jean-Guillaume Moitte serves as his final resting place at the Great St Bernard Hospice (his body originally lay in Milan and was moved to the Hospice in 1805). Moreover, his name is written on a face of the Arc de Triomphe, with many other military figures of the French Revolution. There is also a fort, in Fort-de-France, Martinique, that is named Fort Desaix in his honor. A street, Rue Desaix, and a parallel cul-de-sac, Square Desaix, in the fifteenth arrondissement of Paris, between two metro stations, Bir-Hakeim and Dupleix, also bear his name. Desaix Boulevard is a major street in the Bayou St. John / Fairgrounds district of New Orleans. Several ships of the French Navy have borne the name Desaix in his honor.

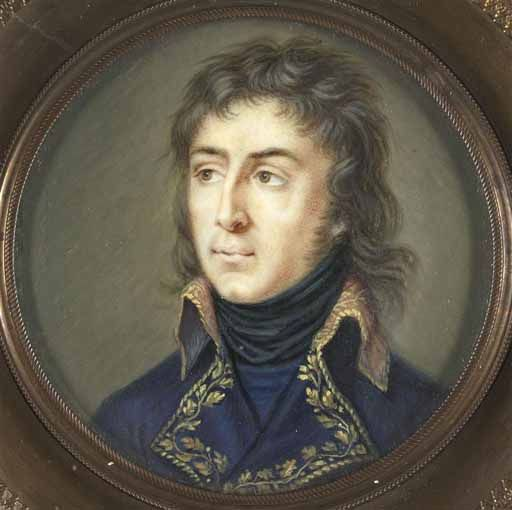
Portrait of Louis Desaix.

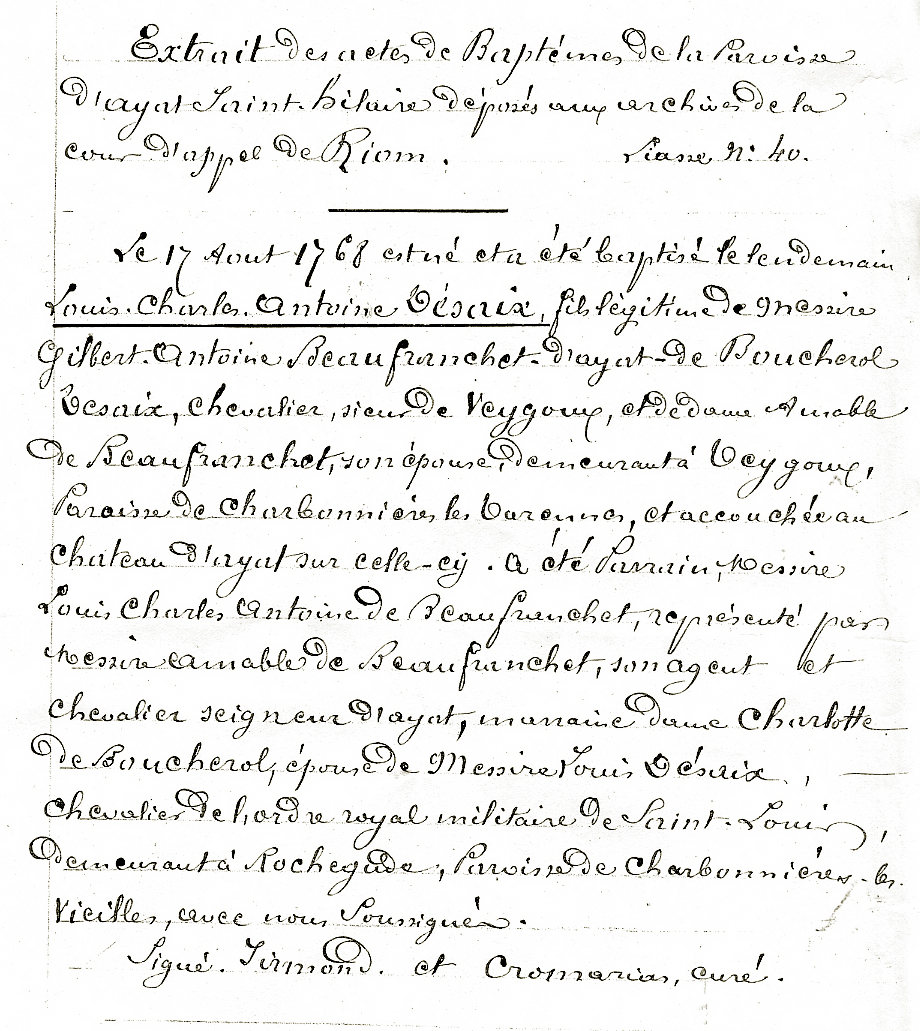
Desaix' baptismal certificate.

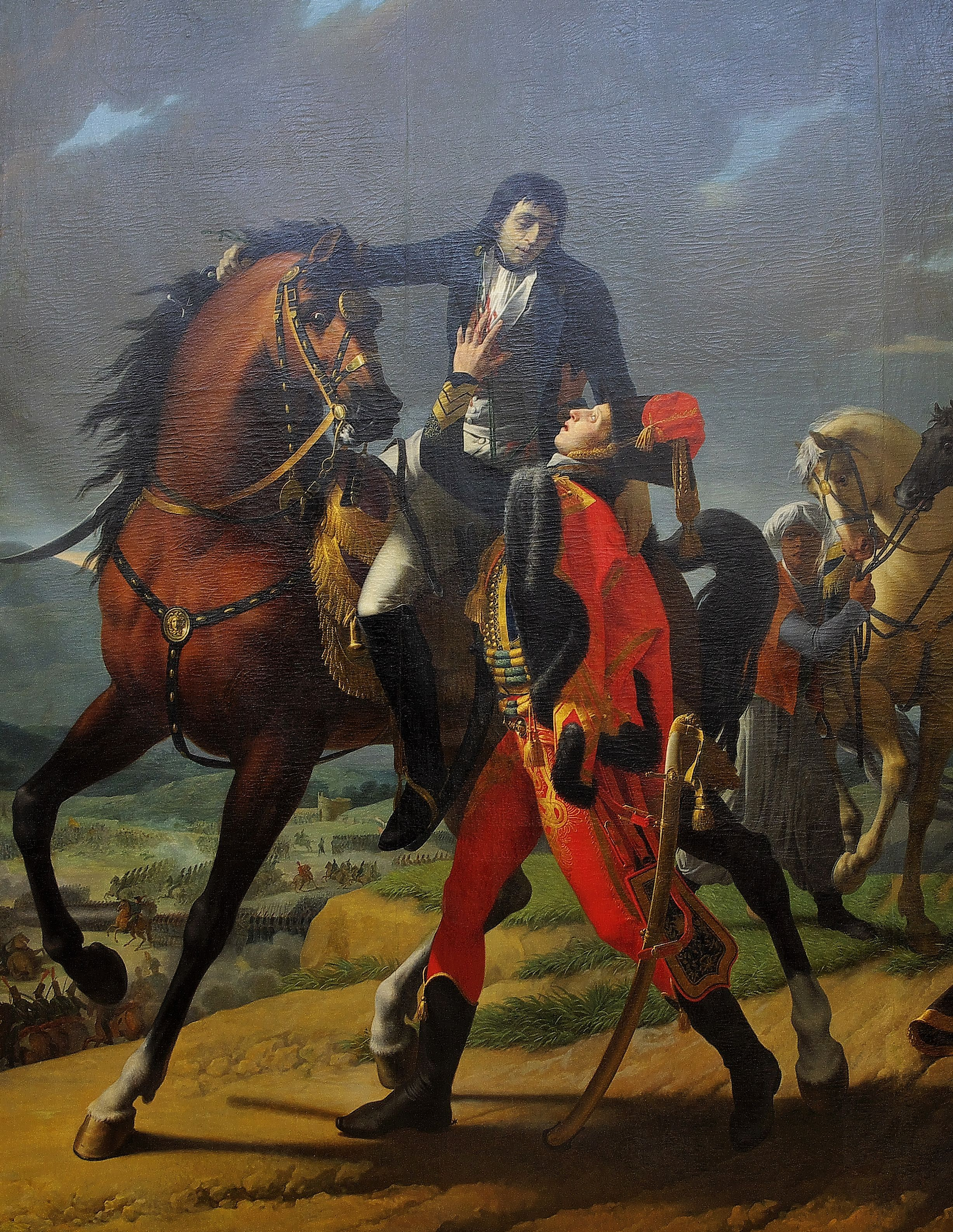
The death of General Desaix by Jean-Baptiste Regnault.

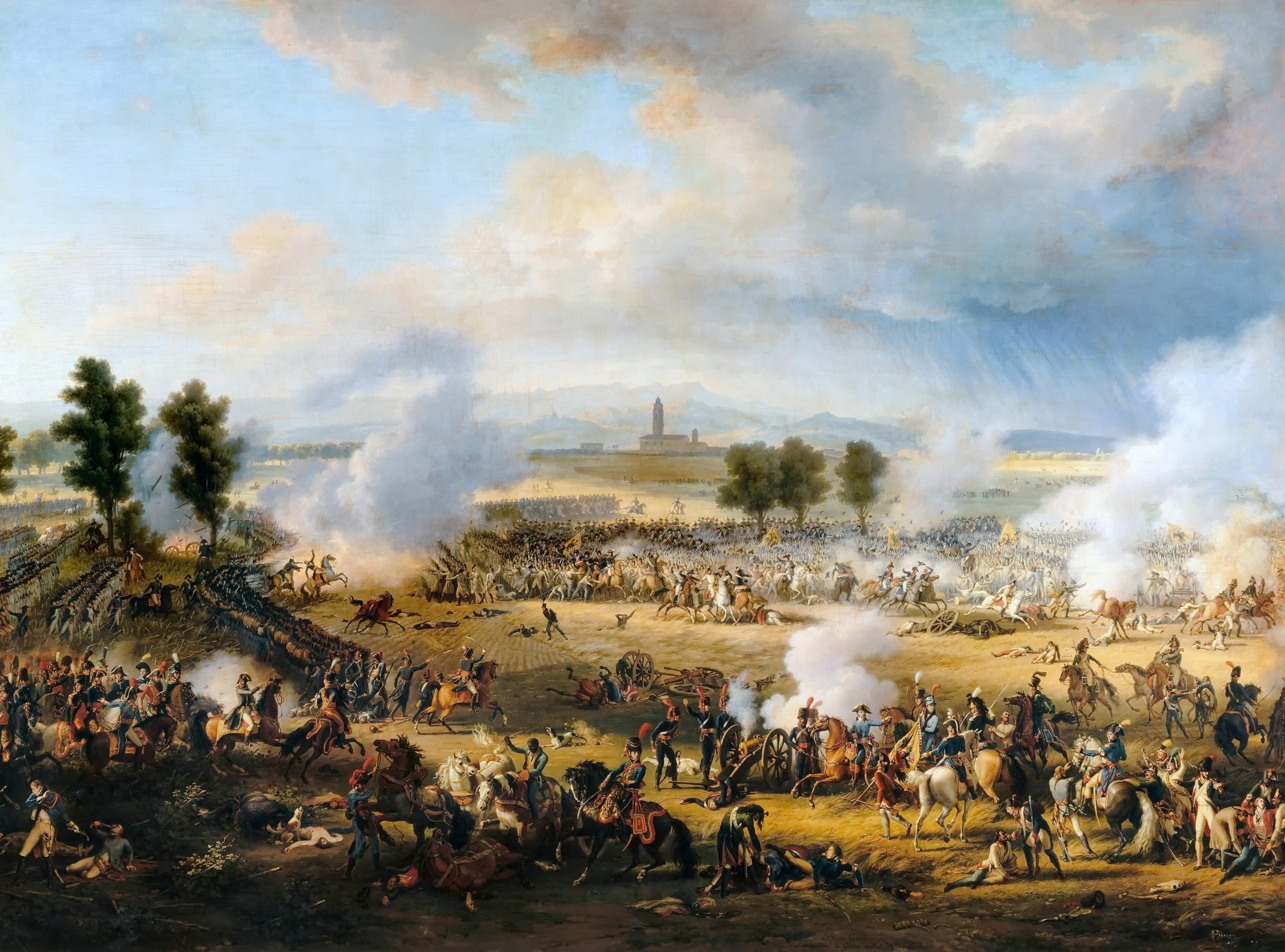
The Battle of Marengo by Louis-François Lejeune, 1801.

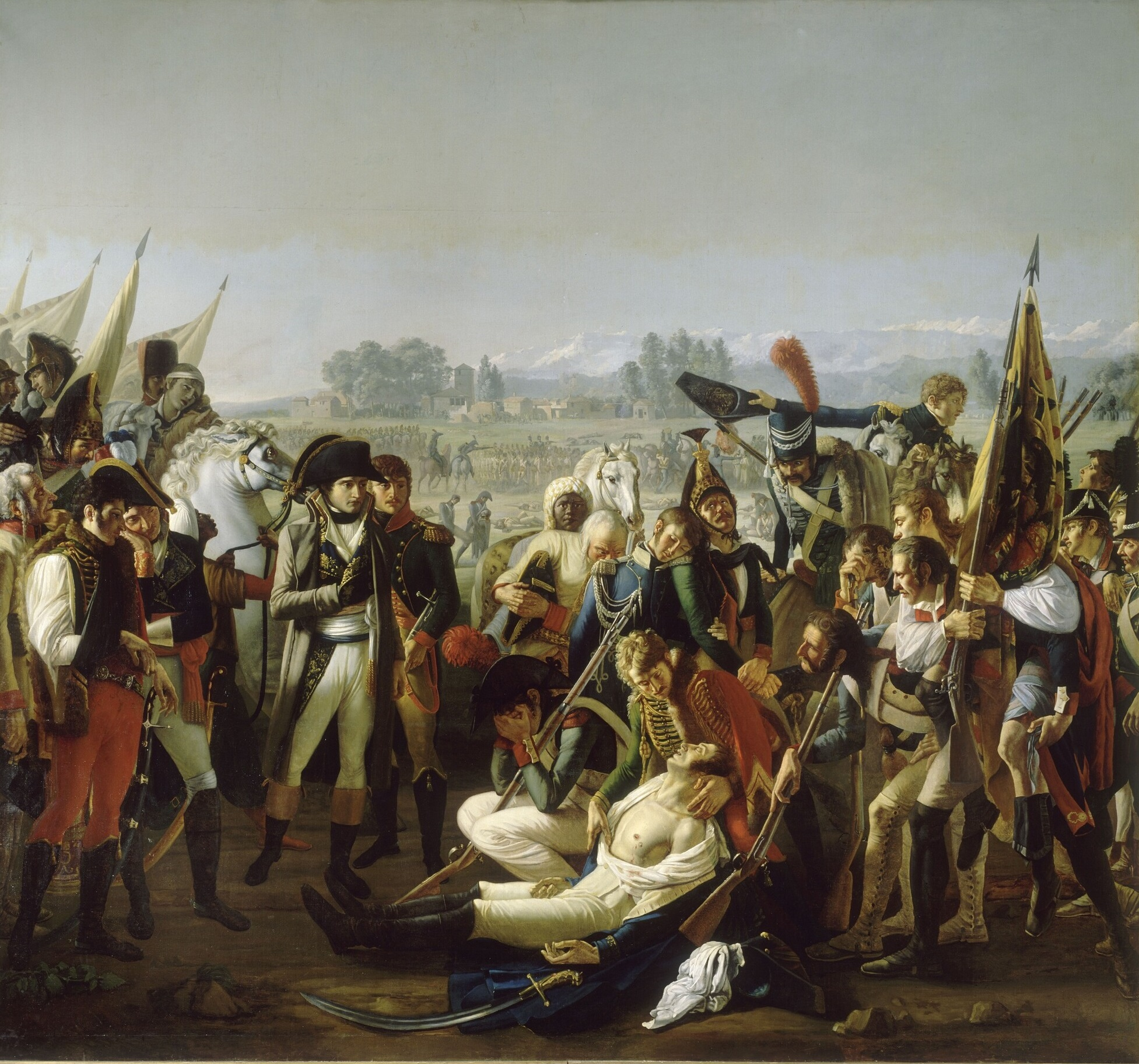
The Death of General Desaix by Jean Broc, 1806

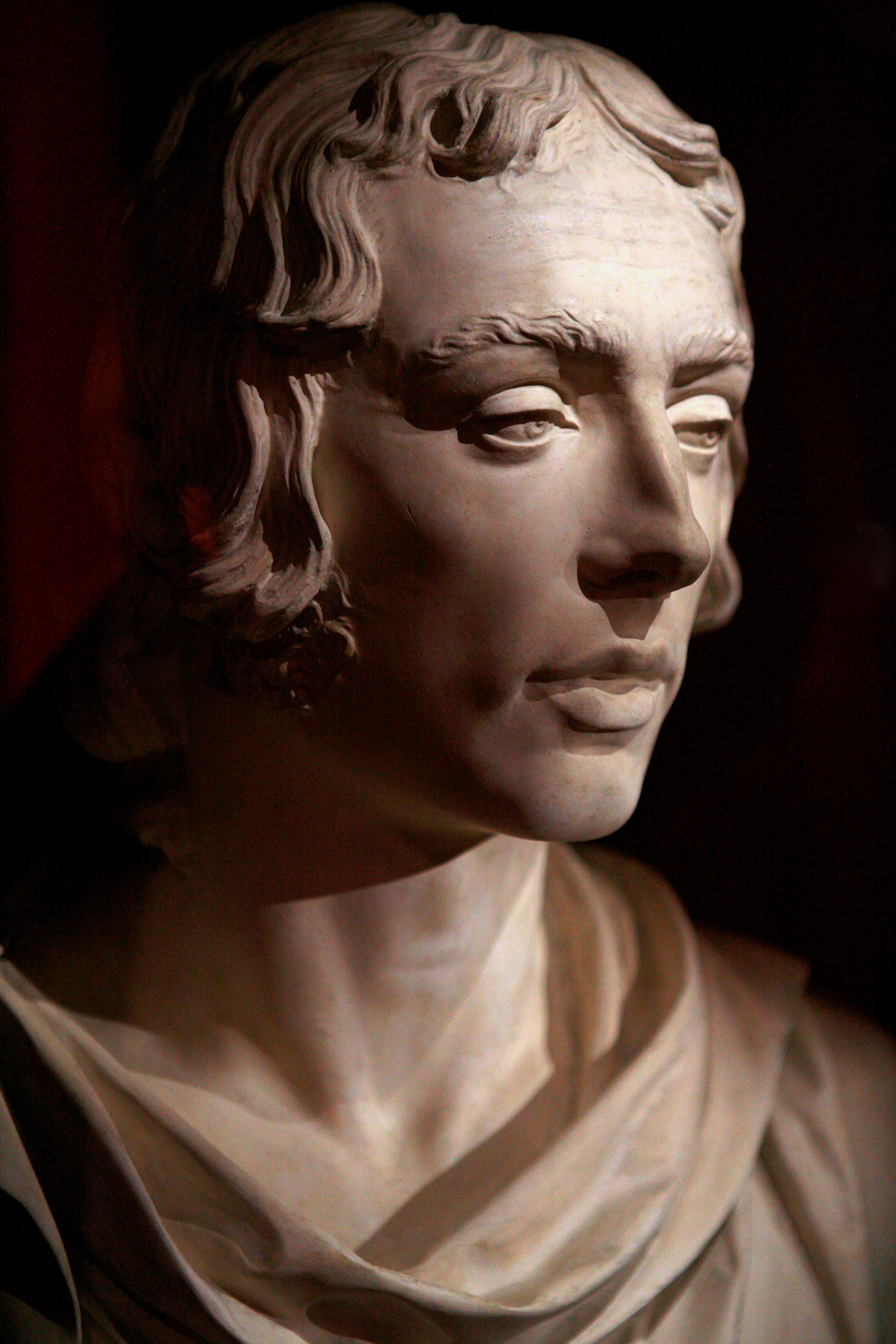
Plaster cast of Desaix' bust by Angelo Pizzi, after his death mask.

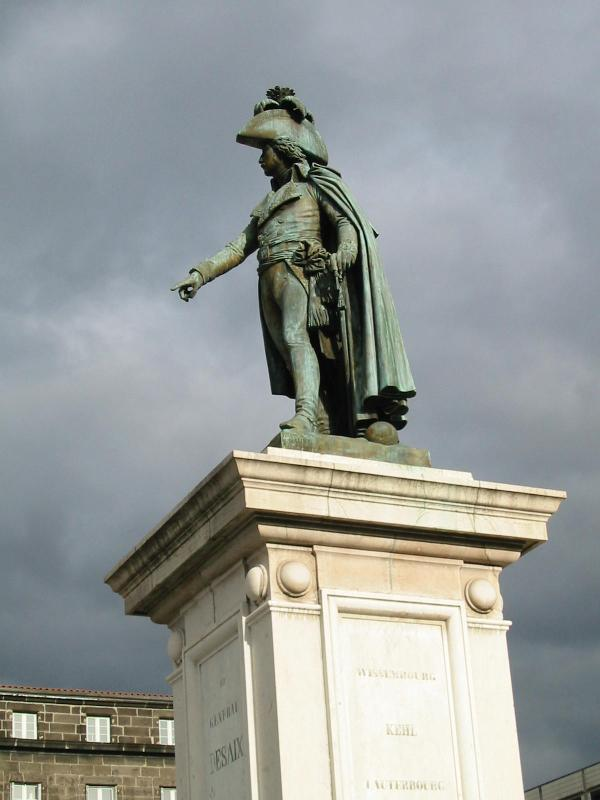
Statue of Desaix on Place de Jaude, in Clermont-Ferrand.

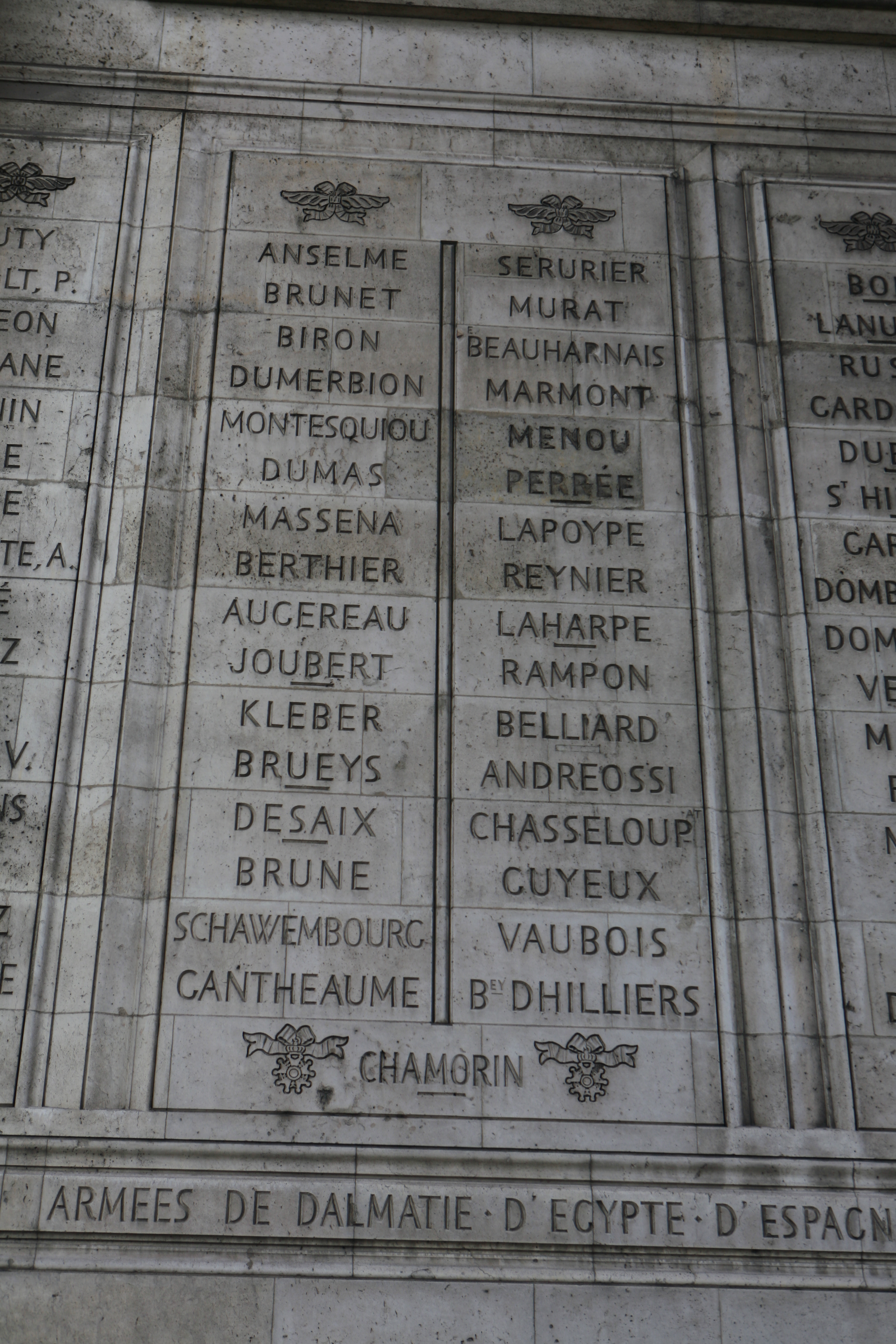
Southern pillar of the Arc de Triomphe, column 23, thirteenth from the top. The underline signifies killed in action.
