= Franz Gabriel Fiesinger =

German copperplate engraver and painter (1723–1807)

Franz Gabriel Fiesinger or Flesinger (12 March 1723 – 21 February 1807) was a German engraver.

He was born in the Free Imperial City of Offenburg in the Holy Roman Empire and raised by Jesuits until the order was suppressed in 1773. He spent the early stages of his career in Germany under the painter Franz S. Stöber, before moving to Switzerland and then France, where he engraved portraits of members of the National Convention. When the Reign of Terror broke out he moved to London, remaining there until 1798 and the birth of the French Consulate. He returned to France, where he reproduced in medallion format the portraits by Jean-Urbain Guérin, Kléber, Desaix, Masséna, Régnier and other Republican generals. He also produced illustrations for the physiognomy of Lavater and engraved several assignats for the mint. He moved back to London in 1802, dying there five years later.

== Gallery ==
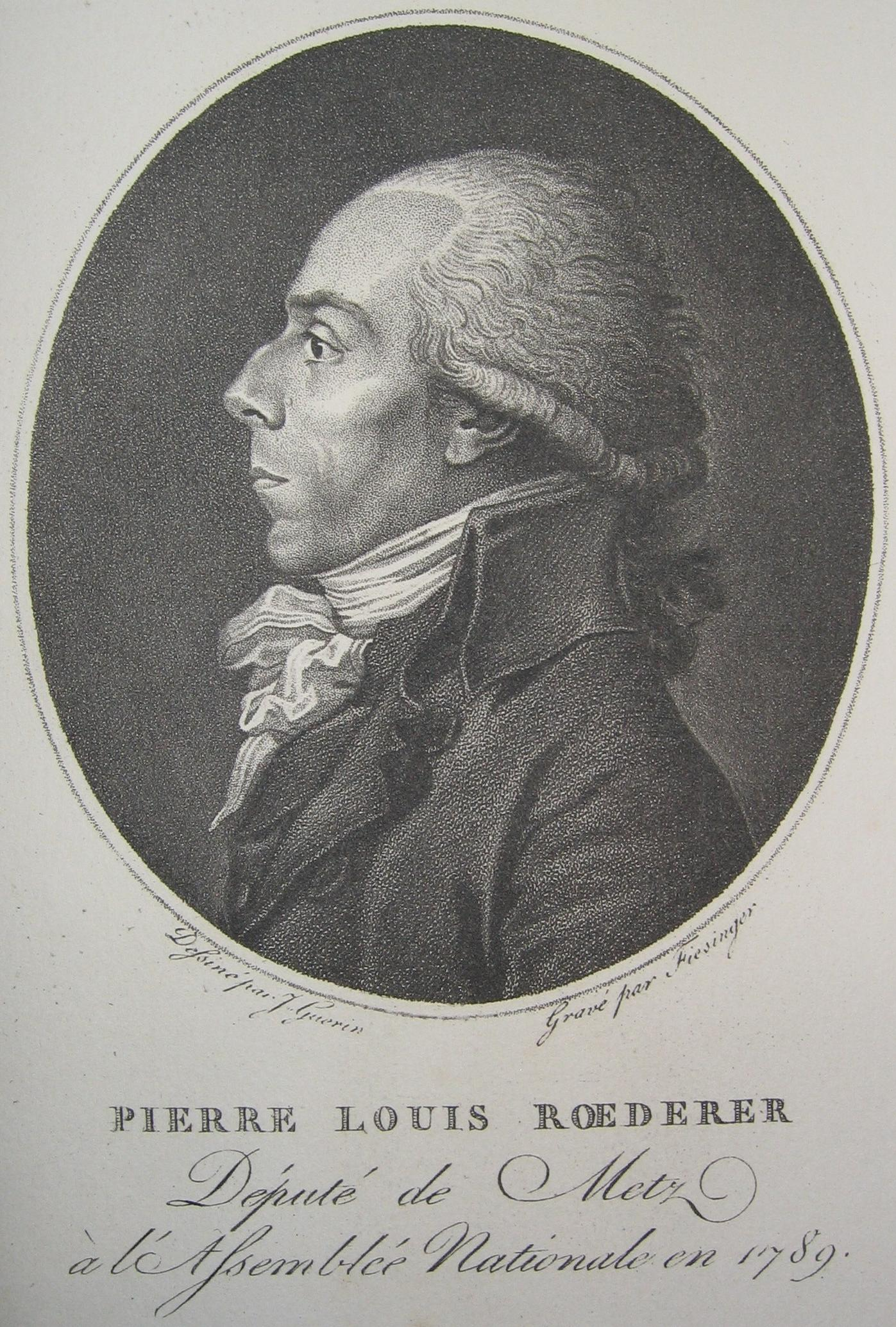
Fiesinger's engraving of Pierre-Louis Roederer after Jean Urbain Guérin

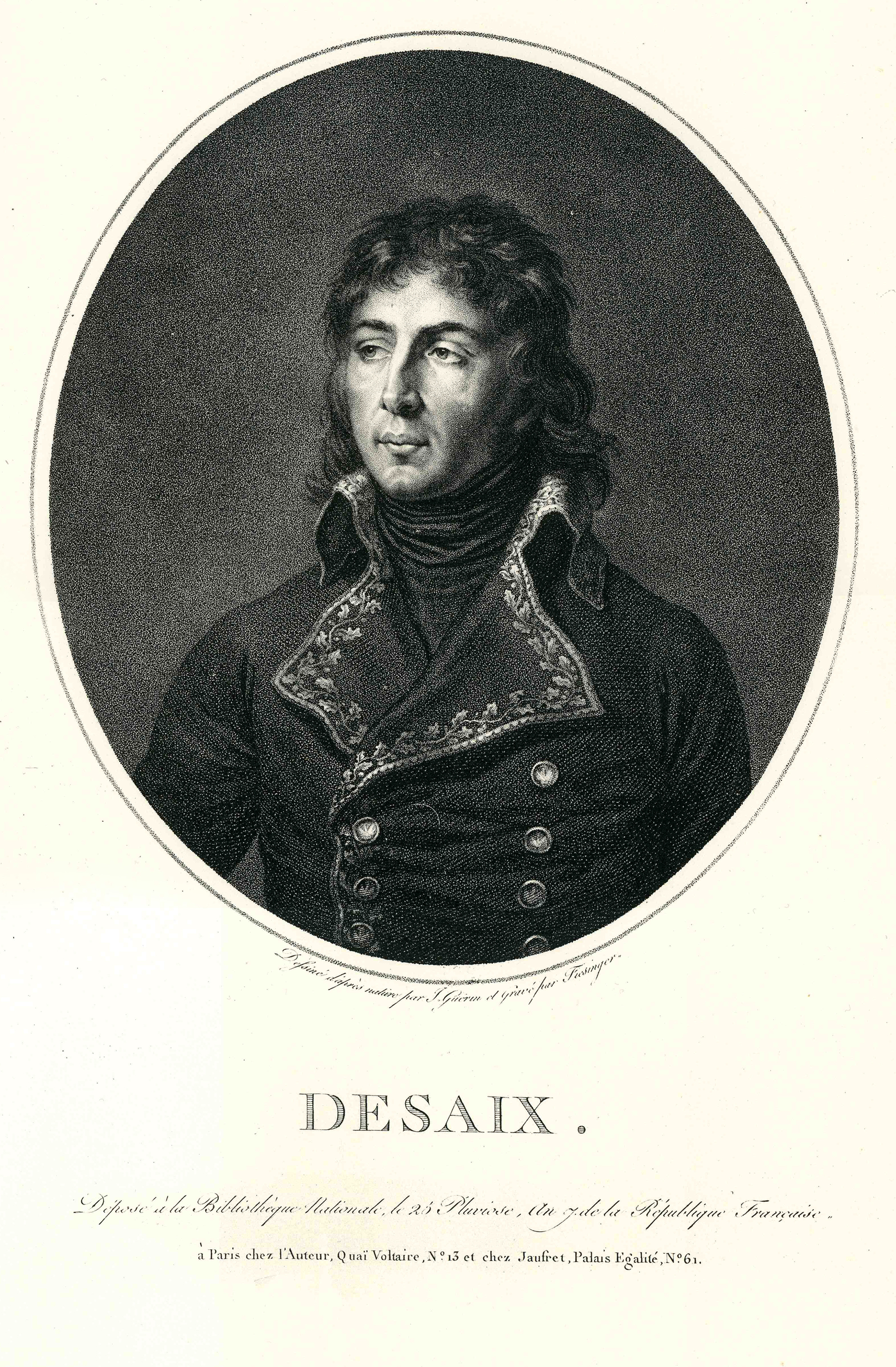
Fiesinger's engraving of Louis Charles Antoine Desaix after Jean Urbain Guérin
