= Tanja Jadnanansing =

Dutch politician (born 1967)

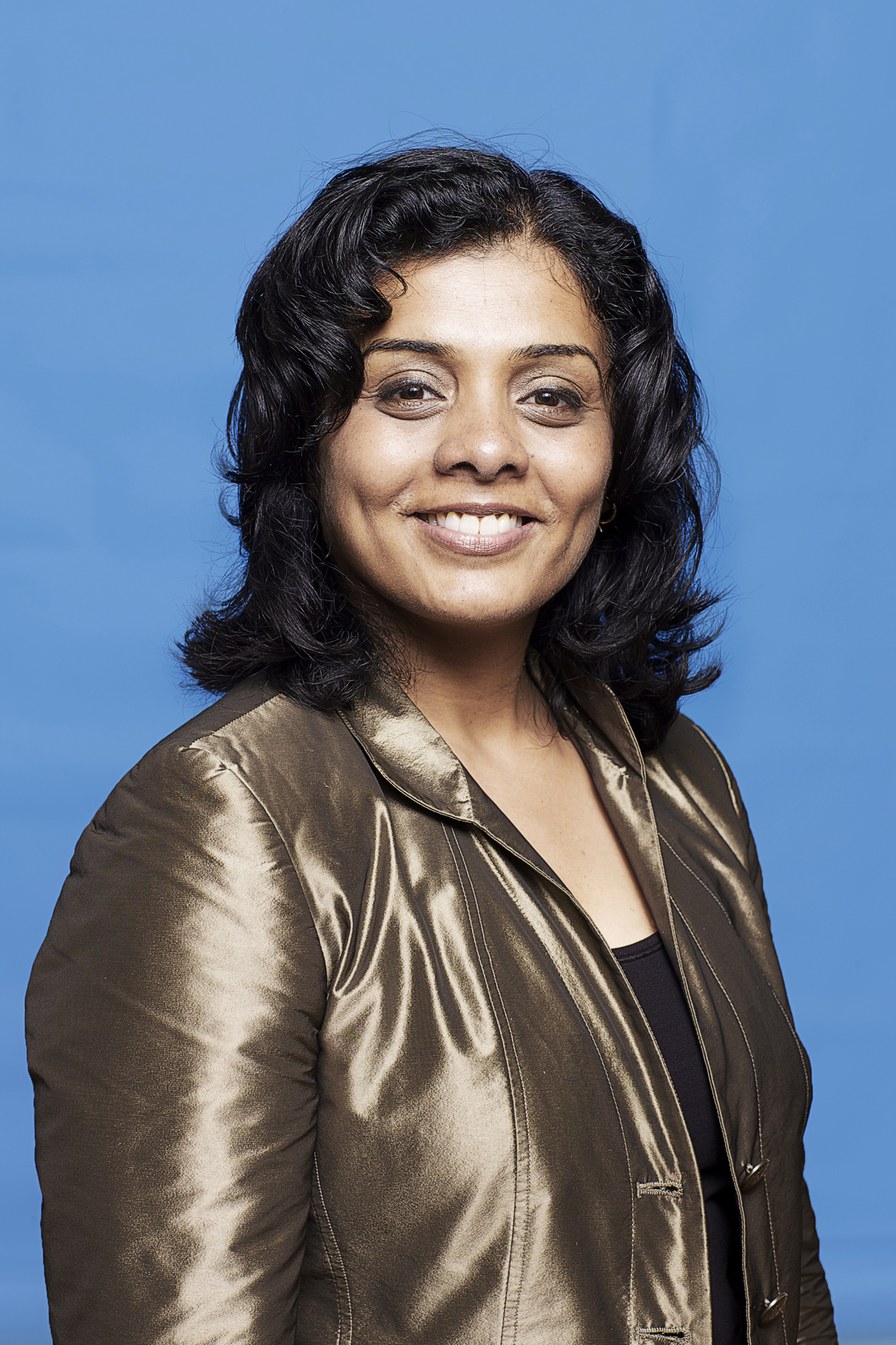
- Tanja Jadnanansing in 2011

Member of the House of Representatives of the Netherlands
- In office 17 June 2010 – 7 September 2016
- Succeeded by: Amma Asante

Personal details
- Born: Tanja Malti Jadnanansing; 26 April 1967 (age 59) Leiden, Netherlands
- Party: Labour Party
- Education: VU University Amsterdam (LL.M.)

Tanja Malti Jadnanansing (born 26 April 1967) is a Dutch politician and former television presenter and communication employee. As a member of the Labour Party (Partij van de Arbeid), she was an MP from 17 June 2010 to 7 September 2016. She was replaced by Amma Asante. Jadnanansing focused on matters of higher education and science policy.

Jadnanansing studied law at VU University Amsterdam. She worked among others for the Netherlands Public Broadcasting (NPO), the Netherlands Broadcasting Foundation (NOS), the Multicultural Television Netherlands (MTNL) and the Foundation Hindu Media (OHM).

Tanja Jadnanansing is an Indo-Surinamese as well as a Hindu. She is married and lives in Amsterdam. Since 2018, Jadnanansing has been chairman of the Executive Board of the Amsterdam-Zuidoost district.
