= Ayah (disambiguation) =

Ayah may refer to:

- Ayah, a verse of the Qur'an
- Ayah or Amah (occupation), a domestic servant
- Paul Abine Ayah (1950–2024), Cameroonian politician, member of the National Assembly of Cameroon
- Princess Ayah bint Al Faisal (born 1990), Jordanian princess
- Ayah Marar (born 1980), singer

== See also ==
- Ayat (disambiguation)
- Amah (disambiguation)
