= André Dutertre =

French painter

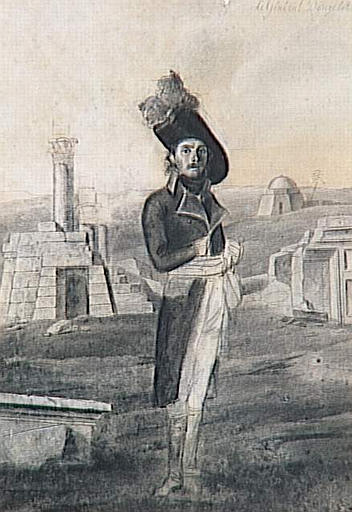
Dutertre, Portrait of general Donzelot during the Egyptian Campaign 1799 Versailles, musée national des châteaux de Versailles et de Trianon.

André Dutertre (9 June 1753 in Paris – April 1842 in Paris) was a French painter.

== Life ==
A professor at the école gratuite de dessin, his students included Vien and Collet.

He took part in the French Campaign in Egypt and Syria and on 22 August 1798 he was made a member of the Institut d'Égypte, in the literature and arts section. He was taken on the trip to the Suez Isthmus on 24 December 1798. He drew 184 portraits of the officers and scholars of the expedition, which were used as illustrations for the Histoire scientifique et militaire by Reybaud and reprinted in the Journal by Villiers du Terrage. He also drew Egyptians - his portrait of Murad Bey is his masterwork.

On his return to France, he exhibited portraits at the Paris Salons of 1804 and 1812, notably those of Desaix and Kléber. The Musée de Versailles owns nearly thirty portraits by him.
