= Ayat (band) =

Lebanese black metal band

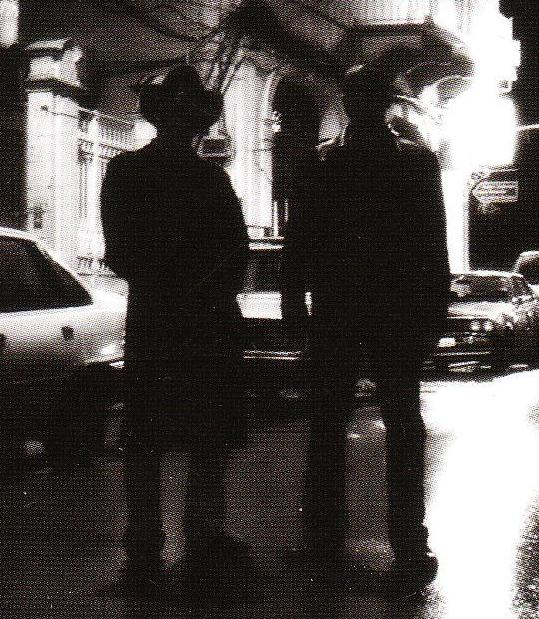
- Ayat in 2004

Background information
- Origin: Lebanon
- Genres: Black metal
- Years active: 1999–present
- Label: Moribund
- Members: Khalil Azzam; Mullah Sadogoat; Huay; Haytham

Ayat are a black metal band from Lebanon.

== History ==
Ayat were formed in September 2000 by Filthy Fuck and Sadogoat. The line-up was completed by drummer Ayman in May 2001. In July 2001, Ayat recorded their first demo, Possession of Sister Clair. Two months later, the band gained "national notoriosity in unmusical ways and gains lots of fans who haven't even heard the Demo and lots of enemies and death threats". In September 2002, the second demo Al Nabi Mojrem Moghtaseib Dajjal was recorded. In November 2002, Ayman left the band; Ayat became inactive until June 2003, when they were reformed with Ayman and Tenebra's drummer Commander as session members. Ayman left the band a month later "in an uncourteous way which pisses off Ayat greatly", whereas Commander stayed in the band for a few more weeks before they stopped their activities again. The band got noticed through their demo and were offered interviews. In August 2003, Sadogoat was "called to defend his fucking country, which makes things worse and naturally slower".

In January 2004, Commander was replaced by Haytham, and the band became active again. In May 2004, the band announced they had completed 12 songs for the new album, Kill, Fuck, Brothers, and Inhale for No Black Rain Shalt Hail, that was to be recorded during the summer. The album remained unreleased. The EP Al Nabi Moujrem, Moughtaseb, Dajjal was released through Sardonic Wrath Records in 2005. Their debut album Six Years of Dormant Hatred was released through Moribund Records in 2008. Ayat never played live, but Reverend Filthy Fuck once helped war metal band Damaar onstage.

In 2010, the band announced they were currently recording their second album, Carry on, Carrion!. However, it was only in November 2017 when this long-expected album was finally released.

== Musical style and ideology ==
According to Moribund Records, the band's album "polarized critics as either 'genius' or 'garbage' but forcing an opinion out of everyone". Metal Hammer journalist Diana Glöckner called it "such an outstanding black metal album that they would have caused a stir even without their […] origin". On their homepage, the band stated that they support "the total annihilation of mankind, mistreatment of women, torture of those who deserve it, and supreme fucking mayhem across all nations, religions and races of the earth". Asked about how his everyday life and the living conditions in Lebanon influenced the band's music and lyrics, Reverend Filthy Fuck replied that their music was only influenced by their everyday life, and that he was surprised when bands were not. "We are surrounded by drug abuse, prostitution, death, disease, war, love, religion every day—it would be weird not to deal with it." According to him, Ayat never cared about censorship in Lebanon because they are an underground band and did not sell any album in Lebanon; "we corrupt the foreign youth, so it seems to be okay for our authorities". He sees the attention the band are getting due to their origin as an advantage, but also as a problem when they encounter racism (such as racist slurs) from Europeans.

== Discography ==
- Possession of Sister Clair (demo, 2001)
- Al Nabi Mojrem Moghtaseib Dajjal (demo, 2002)
- Al Nabi Moujrem, Moughtaseb, Dajjal (EP/single, 2005)
- Six Years of Dormant Hatred (2008)
- Carry on, Carrion! (2017)
