= Ama (title) =

Samoan title

Ama is a title originating c. 1400 AD, and bestowed upon the paramount chief and commander in war of the district of Safata, situated south of the island of Upolu, within the country of Samoa. It is a hereditary title. The title originated from Lotofaga, a village within the Safata district. Lotofaga is a village that sits in the middle of the Safata Bay. The village has been described as the following: 'Here the surf is sometimes so wild that one cannot sleep because of the roar; therefore it is called Galutatu'. It is also known as Le-Faga-o-Alii, translated in Samoan as 'The Bay of Chiefs'. This is in reference to the Ama that resides there. Lotofaga is traditionally known to be a village of refuge for those in need as well as a place to observe and learn of Samoan chief customs and etiquette.

== Origin ==
The origin of the Ama title is explained in a story featuring the father of the first Ama, Leituala, a chief of Lotofaga. One evening, in his wife's village of Aufaga, in the district of Aleipata, Leituala was heading to the village bathing pool, located near a cave. However, the sun had set and light was limited. As Leituala descended into the pool, thousands of tiny lights illuminated his path. As he examined the source of these lights, he found that they came from small crabs with glowing appendices. Named 'Ama Ama' in Samoan language, these crabs had an effect on Leituala, as he told his wife, Miagamoemoe, daughter of Tago, that their first son would receive the name Ama. Miagamoemoe gave birth to a son, who was then named Ama Alolevave, at the behest of Leituala, his father.

== History of the Ama title (c. 1400 to 1650) ==
=== Ama Alolevave (c.1450–1500) ===
Ama Alolevave became a strong and powerful warrior during the many civil wars that beset Samoa. With his military power and strength, he became the paramount chief of Lotofaga and instituted the title of high chief for his father Leituala in the village of Nuusuatia, located to the east of Lotofaga. Alolevave was a contemporary of the famous Samoan warrior, Te'o, son of Fanene. Alolevave met Te'o during a sojourn to his mother's village of Aufaga. Te'o's son was playing a javelin-like game with spears and one narrowly missed Alolevave. Incensed, Alolevave made to approach the young boy, not knowing it was Te'o's son. The young boy fled. Alolevave followed the young boy, who led him to Te'o's house. Te'o came outside and saw that it was the Ama of Safata. Ama pardoned the incident and said that Te'o's son is saved. The word 'saved' in the Samoan language is 'Saolele'. This went on to become one of the titles of the district of Falealili.

Some of the sports prevalent during the time of Ama Alolevave include club fighting, spear throwing (known as 'tologa' in Samoan) and combat training. During one event of tologa (spear throwing), Te'o and Ama Alolevave were competitors in the arena in Falealili. This arena is popularly known as Malae o Falefasa. Ama Alolevave won this event and in turn usurped several titles of Falealili held by Te'o, namely the titles Te'o, Patea, Tu'uamaletao and Saolele. These titles were taken to Safata as trophies. Ama Alolevave also took with him Saolele, the son of Te'o, and the boy that initially threw the spear at him. Saolele became his adopted son.

After Ama's victory in the war against Tuia Taulagi of the village of Vaiee, Ama showed Saolele the land of Fogaea, inland of Nuusuatia and Vaiee. Saolele went on to marry Sinamulivai, daughter of Tamaseu of Apia. The product of this marriage was a boy to whom the title Te'o was bestowed upon, who joined Tuia in the village of Vaiee. This is why Saolele is also known as Matuaalii, translated as 'Patriarch of Chiefs'.

Furthermore, as their land continued to expand, Ama Alolevave set up his father Leituala as the leading high chief in the land of Aumalo in Nuusuatia. The land of Aumalo is still occupied by two families of the Sa Ama clan today, the Leituala and Tuilimu families. A part of Aumalo is the land of Togamau, known as the central gathering point (or malae) for the Satunumafono. The name Togamau refers to the Tonga burial site within Aumalo. This is also where Nafanua instructed Tupai to set up the government of Satunumafono at Niusuatialemamu after the victory over the Alataua at the end of the Tamasoalii War.

Saolele returned to Ama in Lotofaga, leaving his son, Te'o as chief in Vaiee, to serve his father. For this service, Saolele was awarded as a high chief in the Sa Ama clan by his father and thus instituted as a chief in Lotofaga.

In his studies of Samoa, Kramer (1994) provides a pedigree chart for the lineage of the Ama family. It is recorded that Ama Alolevave married Fautua, the daughter of Ale and Taleta. The product of their marriage was Ama Fiame. The name Fiame refers to his maternal great grandmother.

=== Ama Fiame c. 1500–1540 ===
The son of Alolevave was also a strong warrior. During his time as the Ama of Safata, Samoa continued to be beset by instability and civil war. Fiame fought the Tamasoalii war against the Alataua. The Tuamasaga war of Tamasoalii broke out between Satunumafono and the Alataua because the Alataua did not want the Tamasoalii to be the paramount chief over the Alataua. Even though Ama Fiame's grandfather Ale was of the Alautua, he fought the war for Satunumafono, supporting the Tamasoalii. This was due to Ama Fiame's close ties with the Malietoa family and because of his connection to Le Manua, a chief within the Ama clan, and the patriarch of Fitimaupologa and Le Sagalala. When the Alataua was defeated, Fiame Muāgututi’a sent his sons Le’imoa & Le’itūalasā to restore peace with the Alataua. Upon their success, Le’imoa & Le’itūalasā were given the name Pitolua O le Aiga Sa Tunumafono'.

Ama Fiame Muāgututi’a married Salefale Lupeaupepe, the daughter of Luatuanu'u Tufiu of Tufulele. The product of this marriage was Ama Tauaituatasolo.

=== Ama Tauaituatasolo c. 1540–1590 ===
The time of the institution of the Ama was wrought with civil war and in-fighting. Tauaituatasolo's capacity as paramount chief of the Sa Ama clan at this time was no different. As the Sa Ama clan was known as one of the mightiest warriors of native Samoa, they were trained from boyhood to be brave fighters in the areas of spear and club fighting and hand-to-hand combat to ward off warlords intent on conquering their land.

Ama Tauautuatasolo married Luafaletele, the daughter of Ti'a of Falefa. The product of this marriage was Ama Lele.

=== Ama Lele c. 1590–1640 ===
Ama Lele's name is derived from his fighting style- 'Lele' describes his fighting prowess, which involved 'flying' from tree to tree as he fought in battles. Ama fought in many battles, a large majority of which was to maintain ownership and control of the Safata land titles. One such battle was against the warriors of Malietoa. All the land in South Tuamasaga was owned by Faumuina at the time. There was a battle involving the Sa Faumuina clan at the time. The Sa Faumuina had a large kava plantation, the biggest plantation in Samoa at the time. The plantation was located in the land Fusiloa. At the time, Malietoa and his warriors were living in Malie. Faumuina called his people together to attend the big harvest of the kava plantation. It was at this harvest that Malietoa and his warriors conspired to take the plantation. Faumuina and his warriors were losing the battle and were retreating towards south east of Tuamasaga. At the time, Ama Lele was in Vete also known as Salauseu(Tiāvī), close to where the Faumuina were retreating towards.Ama was enjoying the chief's sport of catching game birds and was in a tree when one of his warriors heard commotion headed towards them.Ama came down from the tree just as Faumuina approached and requested his assistance in fighting the Malietoa.Ama obliged and led his warriors in battle against the Malietoa warriors.Already well-renowned as a strong and successful warrior, the Malietoa warriors fled when faced with Ama Lele and his warriors.Ama and his warriors followed the enemy towards Ulufau, to the north of Aleisa. It was there that Faumuina stopped Ama Lele and bestowed upon Ama the land from Aleisa up towards Tuanaimato, as a token of his appreciation. Initially, Ama declined and explained that his assistance was nothing more than a compulsion to aid his friend. Faumuina did not accept Ama's refusal and instead insisted that Faumuina and his warriors accompany Ama Lele and his warriors back to Safata. As they arrived at the top of the mountain range(Āfiamalu), Faumuina stopped Ama Lele for a rest and declared that this would be their shared boundary, the north of the mountain range situated at the head of Lake Lanotoo was to be Faumuina's territory and the south of the mountain range to Mt. Fiamoe towards Papapapaitai also known as Tiāvi(Salauseu)was declared Ama's territory.Ama duly accepted the offer from Faumuina.

Ama fought in and claimed victory in many other wars that contended the land in Samoa. Such wars were fought against the Aiga Sa Tunumafono clan, the Alataua and the Aana and Atua districts.These victories earned Ama Lele the renown of Paramount Chief and Commander of War in Safata.Ama Lele continued to expand his boundaries to the west towards the districts of Aana, with Lemalu and Le Mamea, to the east to the district of Atua with Leota, towards the village of Mulivai, and north to the mountain range with Faumuina and south towards the Pacific Ocean.

Ama Lele married Soli'ai, a daughter of Tui Manua. They produced a son Peseta, who was to become the next Ama, and a daughter, Tohu'ia Limapo. Herewith contains the connection to the Tonga royal lineage through Tohu'ia Limapo. Limapo travelled to Tonga with her father Ama Lele, at the express request of the 6th Tu'i Ha'atakalaua of Tonga, to marry Ama Lele's daughter Limapo. Limapo travelled with a large wedding party, which consisted of the Ama family and warriors under the charge of Ama Lele. During the wedding celebrations, both Samoan and Tongan traditions took place. One such tradition was the sport of club fighting. In the Tongan version of the sport, as soon as the opponent is knocked down, the victor is only allowed to flourish his club over the fallen combatant. However, in the Samoan version of the sport, each combatant is allowed to beat his antagonist after he is knocked down and even still as he perceives signs of motion.

The product of this marriage was Ngata. Previous to Ngata's reign in Tonga, the kingdom was presided over by two authorities, the Tu'i Tonga and the Tu'i Ha'atakalaua. Upon his ascension to the title of Tu'i Ha'atakalaua, his father, Mo'unga'otonga, bestowed upon Ngata the title of Governor of Hihifo, a district in the west of Tongatabu. This title granted Ngata considerable power and provided a strong foundation for his new title of Tu'i Kanokupolu, translated as the Heart of Upolu, a direct homage to his mother's heritage.

=== Legacy ===
Currently, the Paramount title of Ama remains in the district of Safata, Tuamasaga, held by the head of the Sa Ama clan of Lotofaga. The Tu'i Kanokupolu, the initial title bestowed upon Ngata, remains the royal title of the kingdom of Tonga, still held by the current monarch, King George Tupou VI.
