= Ayat-sur-Sioule =

- Commune
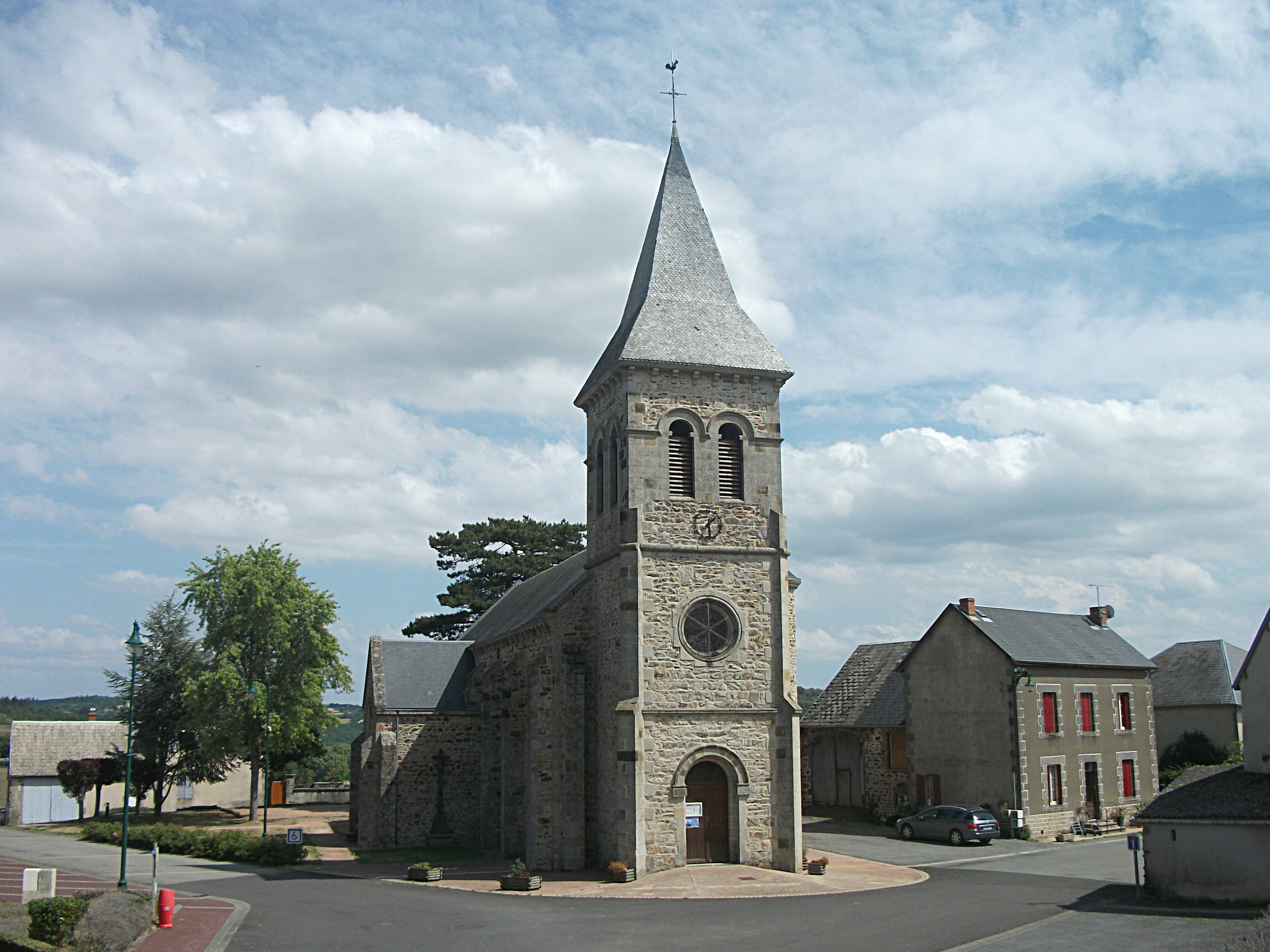
- Church

- Coat of arms
- Location of Ayat-sur-Sioule
- Location within France Location within Auvergne-Rhône-Alpes
- Coordinates: 46°03′02″N 2°53′27″E
- Country: France
- Region: Auvergne-Rhône-Alpes
- Department: Puy-de-Dôme
- Arrondissement: Riom
- Canton: Saint-Éloy-les-Mines
- Intercommunality: CC Pays Saint-Éloy

Government
  - Mayor (2020–2026): Jean-Claude Bellard
- Area^{1}: 14.2 km^{2} (5.5 sq mi)
- Elevation: 500 m (1,600 ft)
- Highest elevation: 716 m (2,349 ft)
- Lowest elevation: 360 m (1,180 ft)
- Population (2023): 138
  - Density: 9.72/km^{2} (25.2/sq mi)
- Time zone: UTC+01:00 (CET)
  - Summer (DST): UTC+02:00 (CEST)
- INSEE/Postal code: 63025 /63390
- ^{1} French Land Register data, which excludes lakes, ponds, glaciers > 1 km^{2} (0.386 sq mi or 247 acres) and river estuaries.

Ayat-sur-Sioule is a commune in the Puy-de-Dôme department in Auvergne-Rhône-Alpes in central France. French Revolutionary General Louis Desaix was born in Ayat-sur-Sioule in 1768 and is considered to be one of the best Generals of the Revolution.

== Population ==
Historical population
Year	Pop.	±% p.a.
1968	196	—
1975	161	−2.77%
1982	159	−0.18%
1990	134	−2.12%
1999	122	−1.04%
2007	137	+1.46%
2012	146	+1.28%
2017	145	−0.14%
2023	138	−0.82%
Source: INSEE

== See also ==
- Communes of the Puy-de-Dôme department
