= American Medical Manufacturers Association =

- Formation: 2021
- Headquarters: Washington, D.C.
- Executive Director: Eric Axel
- Key people: Dan Izhaky, President; Eddie Phanichkul Vice President
- Website: ammaunited.org

The American Medical Manufacturers Association, formerly the American Mask Manufacturers Association, (AMMA) is an organization formed to promote strategic mask, respirator, and Personal Protective Equipment (PPE) manufacturing in the United States.

== Organization and activities ==
Eric Axel serves as executive director while Dan Izhaky and Eddie Phanichkul serve as the President and Vice President of the American Medical Manufacturer's Association (AMMA). AMMA represents more than 15 mask, respirator, medical device, and PPE manufacturers from across the United States. Some manufacturers produced masks during the onset of the COVID-19 pandemic.

During the COVID-19 pandemic, many businesses decided to manufacturer PPE in the US as mayors and governors across the US pleaded with entrepreneurs to set up a PPE supply chain.

AMMA was founded in early 2021 by Brent Dillie (of Amerishield Premium PPE), Lloyd Armbrust (Armbrust American), and Eddie Phanichkul (Lutema USA) among other American mask manufactures who started manufacturing PPE in early 2020 during the COVID-19 pandemic. The mission of AMMA is to increase awareness of US-based manufacturing of PPE, and promote the strategic manufacturing of PPE in the United States to prevent reliance on foreign PPE by working with both state and federal governments in the United States.

In May 2021, Chinese companies, which were nationalized by the Chinese government, flooded the U.S. with cheap surgical masks causing some American businesses that manufactured PPE to downsize or shut down.

In March 2021, the AMMA sent an open letter to President Joe Biden to assure the government that members of AMMA had the capacity to provide PPE to every American in the United States.

In January 2022, the AMMA began working directly with U.S. government officials and The Biden Administration COVID-19 action plan to promote the purchase of American-made masks and respirators for government employees and officials. In an open letter from Senator Tammy Baldwin (D-WI) and Senator Sherrod Brown (D-OH), they applaud the President for distributing N95 masks and federal officials prioritization of American-made masks and respirators. AMMA founding member Eddie Phanichkul additionally voiced his support for Senator Baldwin and Senator Brown for prioritizing American masks manufacturers.

In January 2023, the American Mask Manufactures Association was renamed and relaunched as the American Medical Manufactures Association to become more inclusive of other medical devices and PPE.
