= Amah =

Amah may refer to:

- Amah, a unit of measurement described in the Bible; see Biblical and Talmudic units of measurement
- Amah (mother), a term for "mother" in several contexts
- Amah (occupation), East Asian or South Asian term for a girl or woman employed as a domestic servant
- Amah, an informal and poetic title for the Taoist goddess, the Queen Mother of the West, during the Tang dynasty in China
- Amah Rock, a rock on a hilltop in Sha Tin, Hong Kong

== See also ==
- Ayah (disambiguation)
- Amma (disambiguation)
- Ama (disambiguation)
