= Amma Asante (politician) =

Dutch politician

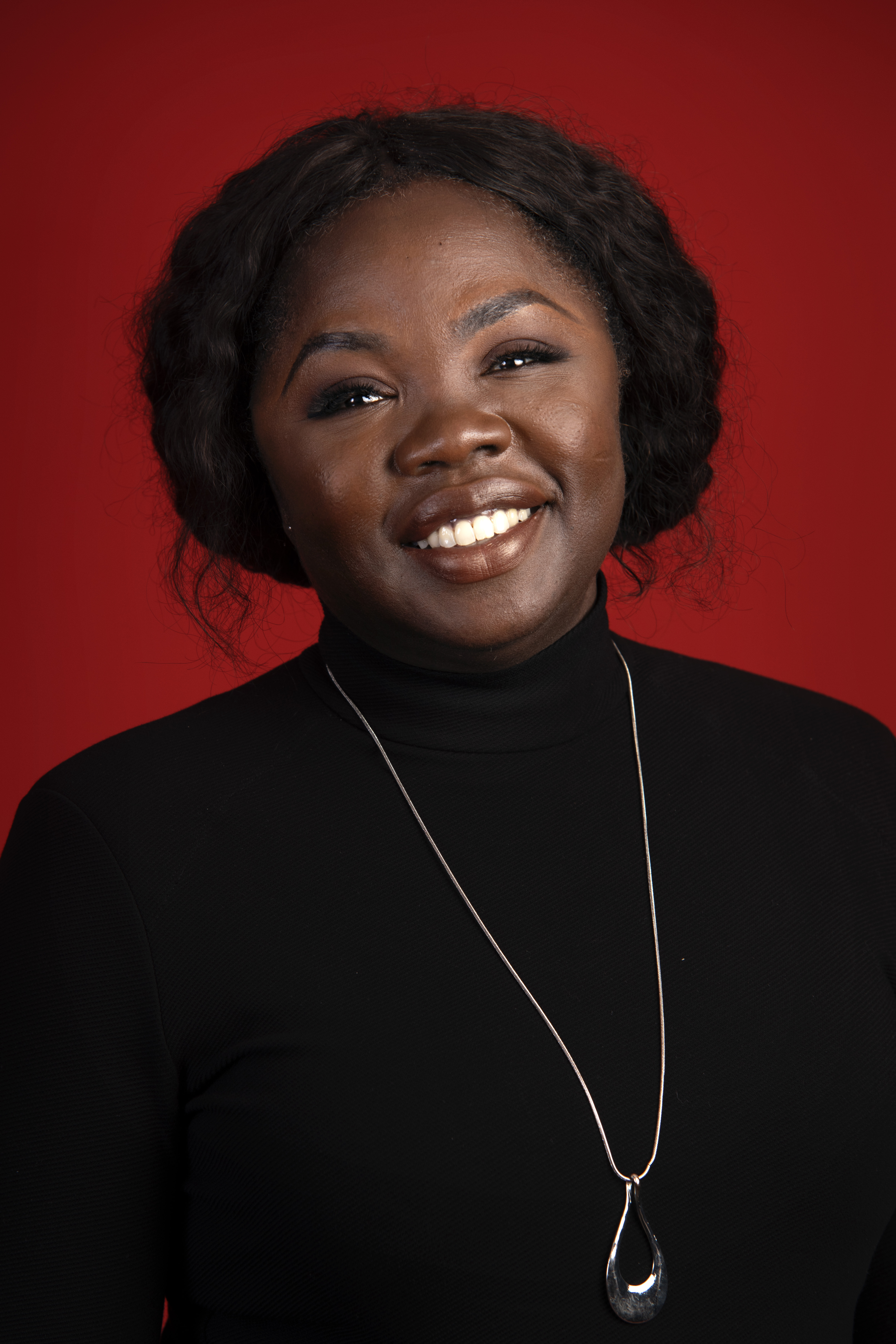
- Amma Asante in 2016

Member of the House of Representatives
- In office 7 September 2016 – 23 March 2017

Member of the municipal council of Amsterdam
- In office May 1998 – March 2006

Personal details
- Born: Amma Asentewaa Asante; 14 May 1972 (age 54) Kumasi, Ghana
- Party: Labour Party (formerly)
- Education: University of Amsterdam
- Website: www.amma-asante.nl

Amma Asentewaa Asante (born 14 May 1972) is a Dutch politician. She was a member of the municipal council of Amsterdam from 1998 to 2006 and a member of the House of Representatives of the Netherlands for the Labour Party from 2016 to 2017. She became chair of the Dutch Media Authority in 2022.

== Early life ==
Amma Asentewaa Asante was born on 14 May 1972 in Kumasi in Ghana. Her father was initially an illegal immigrant in the Netherlands, but he became a legal resident by a general pardon in 1975. For family reunification, Asante and her mother moved to the Netherlands in 1978. Her father was a factory worker and her mother a chambermaid.

Asante studied political science at the University of Amsterdam.

== Politics ==
Asante was a member of the Labour Party (PvdA).

She was member of the municipal council of Amsterdam from May 1998 until March 2006.

Asante was number 50 on the candidate list of the Labour Party for the 2012 Dutch general election. She received 4,549 preferential votes, but was initially not elected. She was number 36 on the candidate list of the Labour Party for the 2014 European Parliament election. She received 574 preferential votes, but was not elected.

Asante became a member of the House of Representatives on 7 September 2016, when she replaced Tanja Jadnanansing. Here she is the party spokesperson for higher education. She was number 36 on the candidate list of the Labour Party for the Dutch general election on 15 March 2017. The Labour Party won nine seats in the election, so Asante left the House of Representatives on 23 March 2017. She was number 47 on the candidate list of the Labour Party for the Dutch general election on 17 March 2021.

== Personal life ==
Asante is married and has two daughters. She lived in Badhoevedorp as of 2017.

Asante is a Protestant Christian and attends the Triumphant Faith Chapel in Badhoevedorp, where her husband is a pastor. In 2016, when she was asked why she was not member of a confessional political party, Asante said: "Christianity and social democracy are very similar. I feel great in the Labour Party, I feel at home there. My identity is not only established by my religion."
