= Veterans Appeals Improvement and Modernization Act of 2017 =

Veterans Administration Reform Act

The Veterans Appeals Improvement and Modernization Act of 2017 (Public Law 115-55), also known by the acronym AMA, is a law that reformed how the United States Department of Veterans Affairs handled and adjudicated appeals of claims for veterans' benefits. It was signed into law by President Donald Trump on August 23, 2017, and was one of several VA reforms moved through the House and Senate Committees on Veterans' Affairs that year. The law removed three time-consuming steps in the appeals process: the issuance of a Statement of the Case (SOC), the filing of a VA-9, and the Certification of Appeal. It also removed VA regional offices from the appeals process. Appeals now go directly to the Board of Veterans' Appeals.

The most significant change made by the AMA is its requirement that the Board of Veterans Affairs provide denied claimants with identification of favorable findings in its notice of a decision. The requirement is one of six new requirements that greatly enhance the utility of Board notices.

== New appeals process ==
=== Organizational processes ===
Under the appeals process put into place by the Appeals Modernization Act, VA regional offices will only adjudicate claims. The Board of Veterans' Appeals will now handle appeals directly. Veterans must file a notice of disagreement to initiate an appeal with the Board. However, under the new process, veterans can request for higher level review or file a supplemental claim which allows them to "develop the record . . . before initiating an appeal." Supplemental claims allow veterans to develop the record because at that step the veteran can add new relevant evidence which will be evaluated by a reviewer at the regional office.

New appeals are now organized into three streams based on the complexity of the issue. However, appeals that were ongoing prior to the AMA taking effect remain in the old system. Upon appeal, veterans have three options in the new system, they can have their appeal as it is reviewed by a judge, they can submit additional evidence within 90 days of the filing, or they can have a hearing with a veterans law judge where they can submit new evidence. The first two options do not end in a hearing. Claimants' best course of action depends on the circumstances of their claim.

Following the implementation of the new AMA system, the Board has gone through a record number of appeals. In 2018, the Board made 85,000 decisions and in 2019, the Board made 95,000 decisions.

=== New notice requirements ===
The Appeals Modernization Act greatly enhanced the notice requirements in U.S.C. § 5104. The Board must provide notice to veterans after it makes a decision on their appeal. After the AMA went into effect, this notice includes:

"(1) Identification of the issues adjudicated."
"(2) A summary of evidence considered by the secretary."
"(3) A summary of the applicable laws and regulations."
"(4) Identification of findings favorable to the claimant."
"(5) In the case of a denial, identification of elements not satisfied leading to the denial."
"(6) An explanation of how to obtain or access evidence used in making the decision."
"(7) If applicable identification of the criteria that must be satisfied to grant service connection or the next higher level of compensation."

The first two requirements existed prior to the AMA's enactment, however the latter six requirements are new and provide veterans with "valuable information." The legislation failed to include a definition for "issue" and it is likely that the first requirement will be the subject of litigation to determine what it means.

The fourth requirement—requiring the VA to identify favorable findings—is "the most significant change made by Congress" in the AMA. All adjudicators are bound by the favorable findings listed in the notice. It allows veterans to focus on the unfavorable findings without worry that the next adjudicator will reverse the prior favorable finding.
