= Kollakkayil Devaki Amma =

Indian forester

Devaki Amma
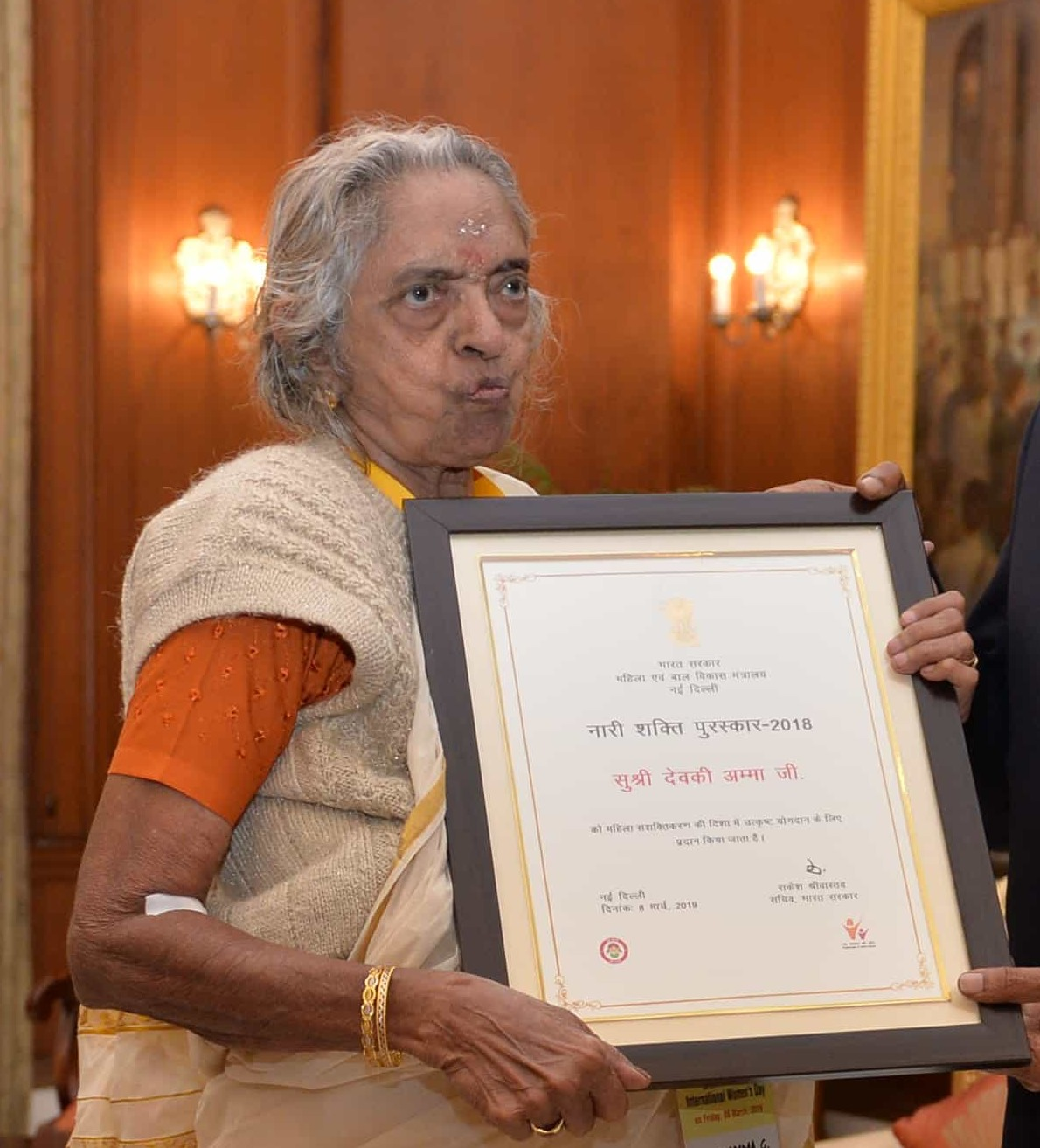
- Amma receives the Nari Shakti Puraskar
- Born: Kollakkayil Devaki Amma c. 1934; Muthukulam
- Occupation: Forester
- Known for: Nari Shakti Puraskar

Kollakkayil Devaki Amma (born c. 1934) is an Indian woman who began to grow a forest after a car crash prevented her from farming. The forest now covers 4.5 acres and has over 3,000 trees. She has received several awards for her work, including the Nari Shakti Puraskar.

== Early life ==
Devaki Amma was born c. 1934 in Muthukulam in Alappuzha district, Kerala. A love of horticulture was inspired by her grandfather. She married Gopalakrishna Pillai, who was a in teacher, and worked in the paddy fields growing rice. In 1980, Devaki Amma was involved in a serious car crash, which left her bed-ridden for three years.

== Forest ==
After she recovered from the crash, Devaki Amma was unable to work in the paddy fields so she began to plant trees in her back garden. Over time this project developed into a 4.5 acre forest. It contains over 3,000 trees, including krishnanal, mahogany, mango, musk, pine, star and tamarind. There are also rare plants and the wood attracts birds such as Amur falcons, bluethroats, black-winged stilts, paradise flycatchers and emerald doves. Devaki Amma worked for over thirty five years on the forest mostly on her own, using cows, buffalo and oxen, and harvesting rainwater.

== Awards ==
Devaki Amma was given the Social Forestry Award by the Alappuzha district and the Bhumitra Puruskar by Vijnana Bharati. The state of Kerala bestowed upon her the Hari Vyakti Puruskar. On the national level she has received the Indira Priyadarshini Vrikshamitra award and the Nari Shakti Puraskar. The latter was given to her by the President of India, Ram Nath Kovind.
