= Jean-Urbain Guérin =

French draughtsman and miniaturist (1760–1836)

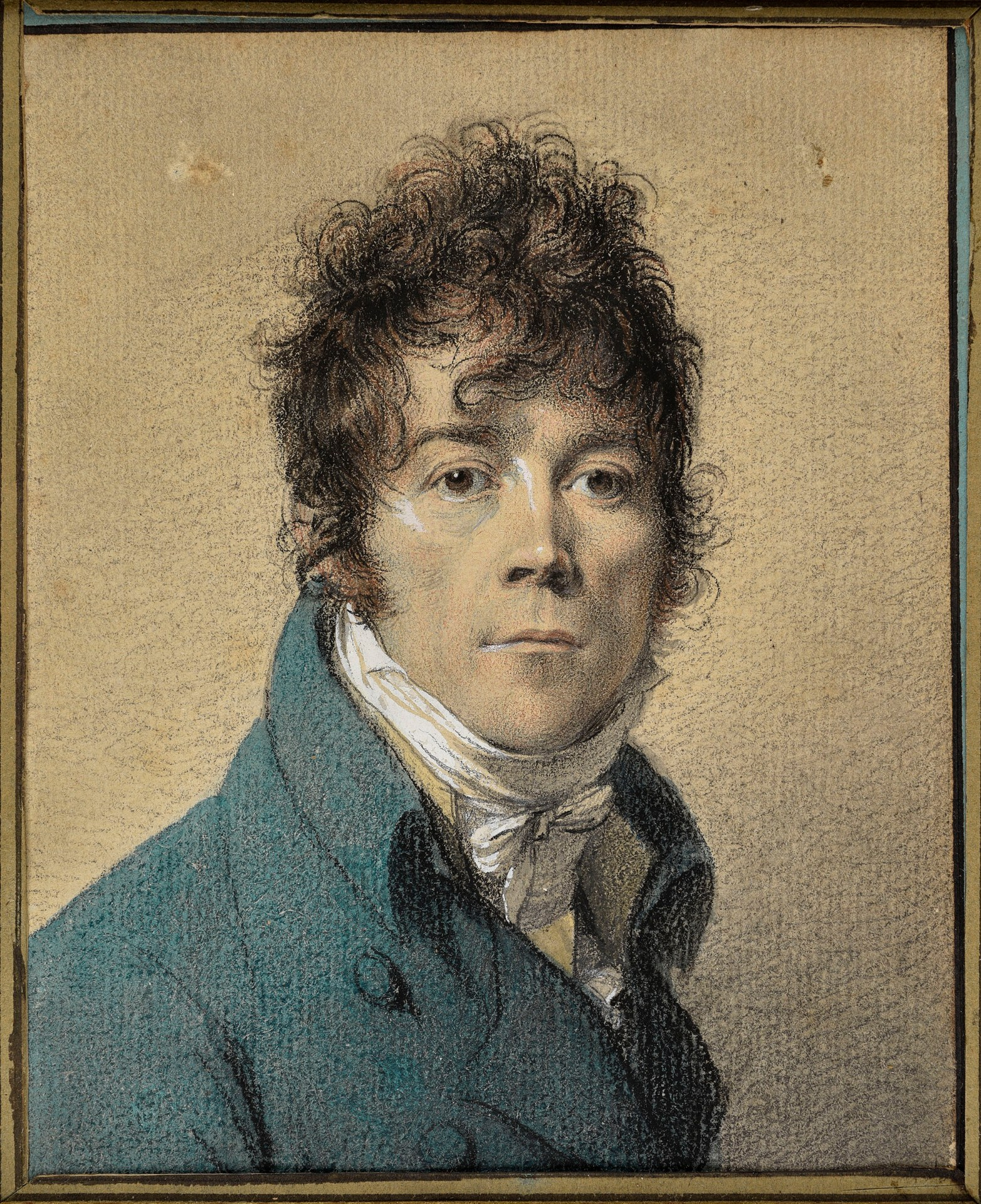
Jean-Urbain Guérin, Self-portrait, 1803 (Strasbourg, Cabinet des estampes et des dessins)

Jean-Urbain Guérin (French pronunciation: [ʒɑ̃ yʁbɛ̃ ɡeʁɛ̃]; 1760 – 29 October 1836) was a French draughtsman and miniaturist. With Jean-Baptiste Isabey and Jacques Augustin, he is still held to be one of the most notable miniaturists of his time.

Guérin himself wrote in his accounts book that in 1791 he produced a portrait of Georgiana, Duchess of Devonshire, who was a friend of queen Marie-Antoinette. He also painted Marie-Antoinette herself and her husband Louis XVI and drew portraits of several deputies of the third estate in 1785, which were later engraved by Franz Gabriel Fiesinger. After the French Revolution he also painted portraits of several generals of the French First Republic, which were often reproduced, as well as images of Kléber, Napoleon Bonaparte and Mozart.

== Life ==
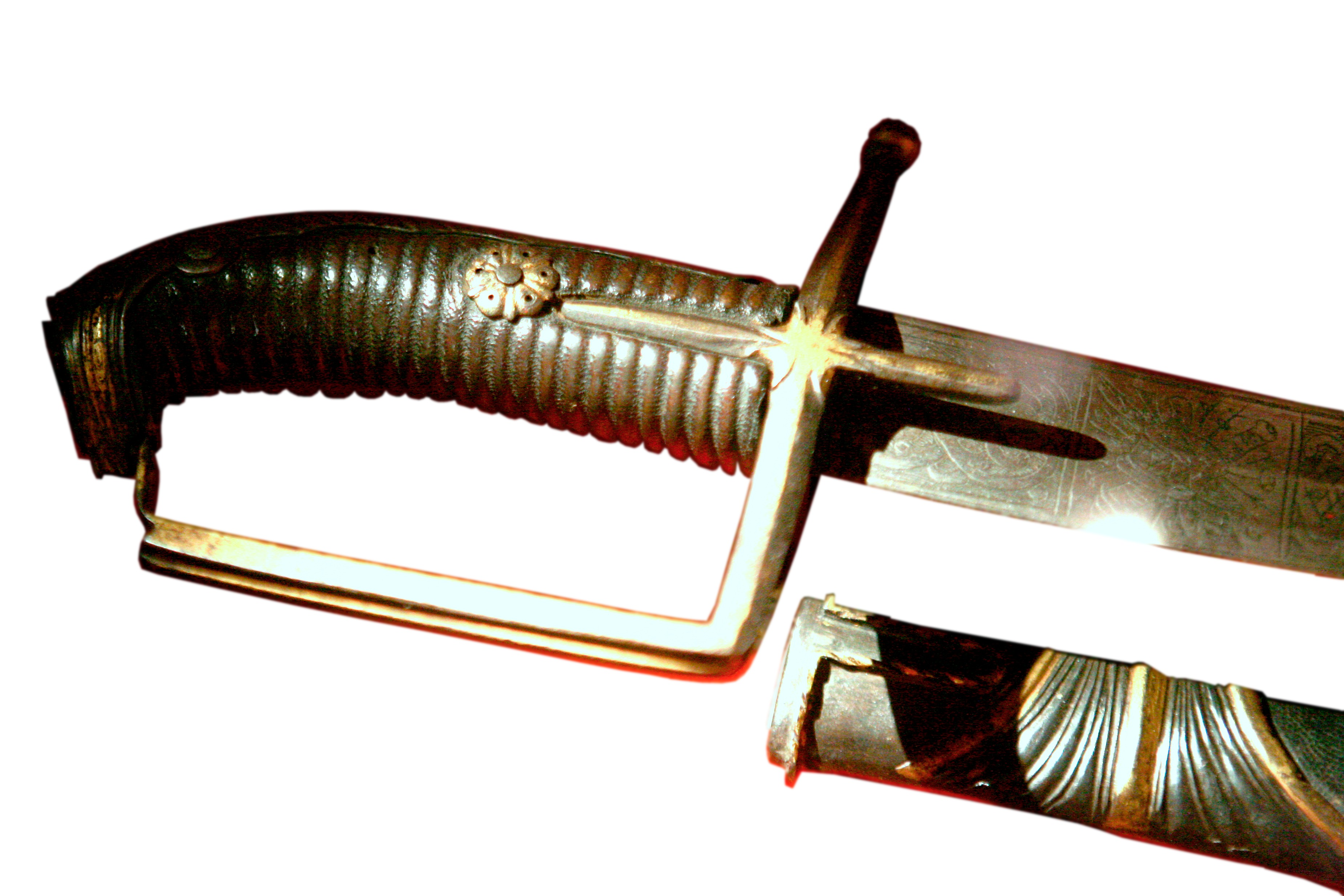
Cavalry officer's sabre with Hungarian hilt, offered to Guérin by Kléber, musée historique de Strasbourg.

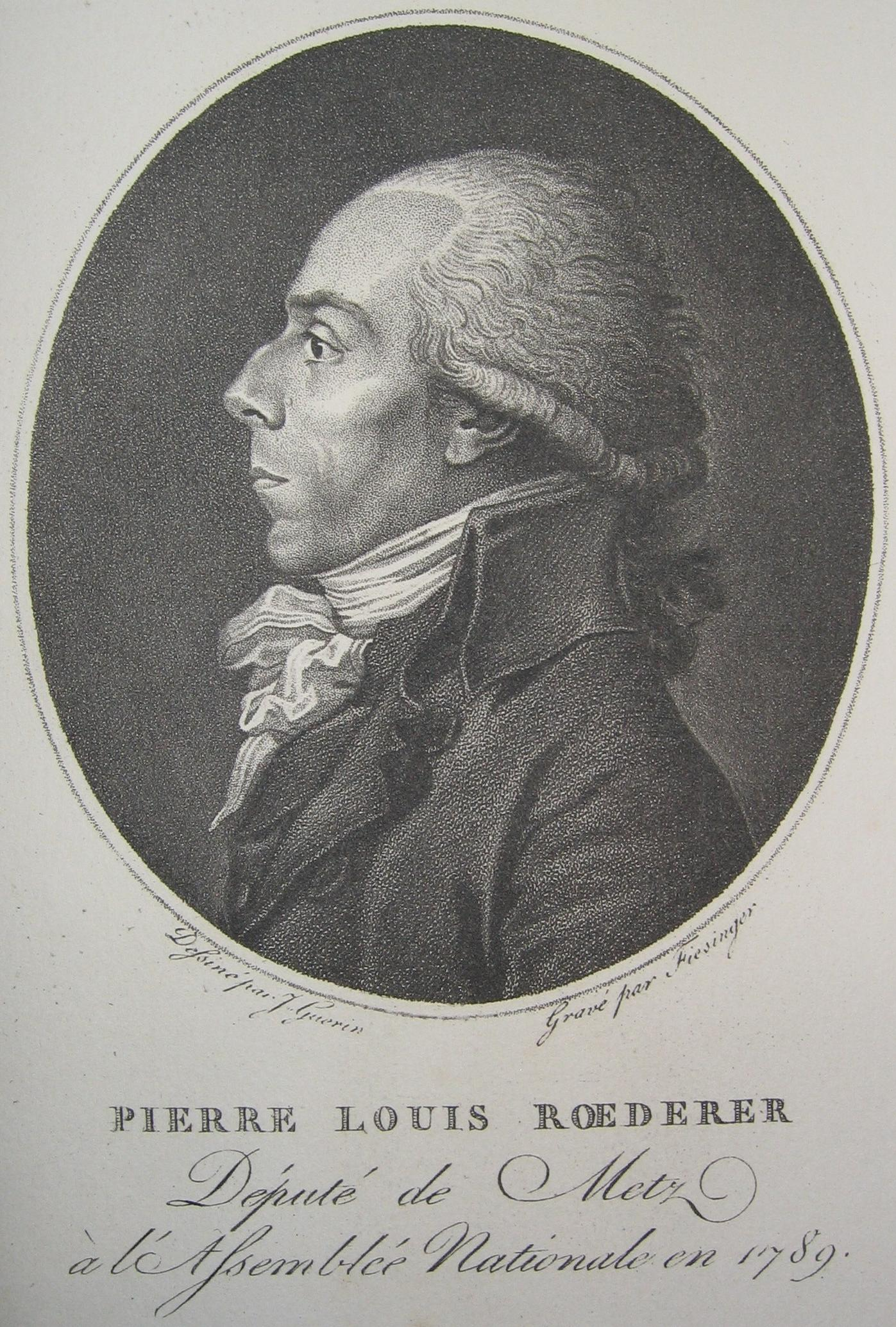
Pierre-Louis Roederer, engraving by Franz Gabriel Fiesinger after a drawing by Jean Urbain Guérin.

Born in Strasbourg, he was the son of the engraver Jean Guérin of that city. His brother Christophe Guérin (1758–1831) became a painter and engraver, whilst Jean-Urbain's nephew Gabriel-Christophe Guérin (1790–1846) became a painter. Jean-Urbain trained under his father then under Huin. Like Prévost and Amat, Guérin did his final training under Jean-Baptiste Regnault. He was sent to Paris with Jean-Baptiste Kléber, a childhood friend, and worked among natives of Alsace who happened to be in Paris, particularly Jean-Baptiste Weyler, who advised him to specialise in miniature painting.

He took an apprenticeship under Jacques-Louis David before working with Jean-Baptiste Isabey, seven years Guérin's junior, after meeting him in David's studio. David commissioned a portrait of one of his daughters from Guérin just before her marriage - Guérin accepted but only on the condition that David would pose his daughter for him. Marie-Antoinette became his main patron and protector. By 1792 he was a member of the Filles Saint-Thomas section of the National Guard, with whom he defended the royal family against the sans-culottes during the Demonstration of 20 June that year.

He was suspected under the Reign of Terror and left France to join Desaix's division during Napoleon's Egyptian campaign, only returning in 1799 under the French Consulate. He then entered the service of Napoleon's wife Joséphine de Beauharnais and exhibited at the Paris Salon until 1827. He died in Obernai on 29 October 1836.

== Selected works ==
- Bordeaux, musée des arts décoratifs et du design : Young man in gloves, watercolour and gouache on ivory, bought by the city in 1958.
- Paris, musée du Louvre, miniatures, of which eight were given by Félix Doisteau and ten by David David-Weill, including:
  - Portrait of Madame Jean-Baptiste de Boullogne as a vestal virgin, given by David David-Weill in 1947;
  - Portrait of general Kléber, bought in 1849 from Monsieur Delattre
  - Portrait of countess Montangon, given by Félix Doisteau in 1919
  - Portrait of count Alphonse de Perrégaux, given by David David-Weill in 1947

== Bibliography (in French) ==
- Georges Foessel, « Jean Urbain Guérin », in Nouveau dictionnaire de biographie alsacienne, vol. 14, p. 1322.
- Jules Renouvier, Histoire de l'art pendant la Révolution considéré principalement dans les estampes, Paris, Librairie Renouard, 1863.
- Leo R. Schidlof, La Miniature en Europe, aux XVI, XVII, XIX siecles, Graz, 1964, pp. 330–331.
- Pierrette Jean-Richard, Inventaire des miniatures sur ivoire conservées au cabinet des dessins, musée du Louvre et musée d'Orsay, Paris, 1994, pp. 154–164.
- L'Âge d'or du petit portrait, [catalogue d'exposition], Bordeaux, Genève, Paris, 1995, p. 52.
- Portraits des maisons royales et impériales de France et d'Europe : les miniatures du musée Condé à Chantilly, Somogy éditions d'art, 2007.
