= Amma, Iran =

Amma اما
- Village
- Location within Iran
- Coordinates: 33°27′42″N 46°26′00″E
- Country: Iran
- Province: Ilam
- County: Malekshahi
- Bakhsh: Gachi
- Rural District: Gachi

Population (2006)
  - Total: 58
- Time zone: UTC+3:30 (IRST)
  - Summer (DST): UTC+4:30 (IRDT)

Amma (Persian: اما, also Romanized as Ammā and Amā) is a village in Gachi Rural District, Gachi District, Malekshahi County, Ilam Province, Iran. At the 2006 census, its population was 58, in 13 families. The village is populated by Kurds.
