= The Forged Coupon =

1911 novella by Leo Tolstoy

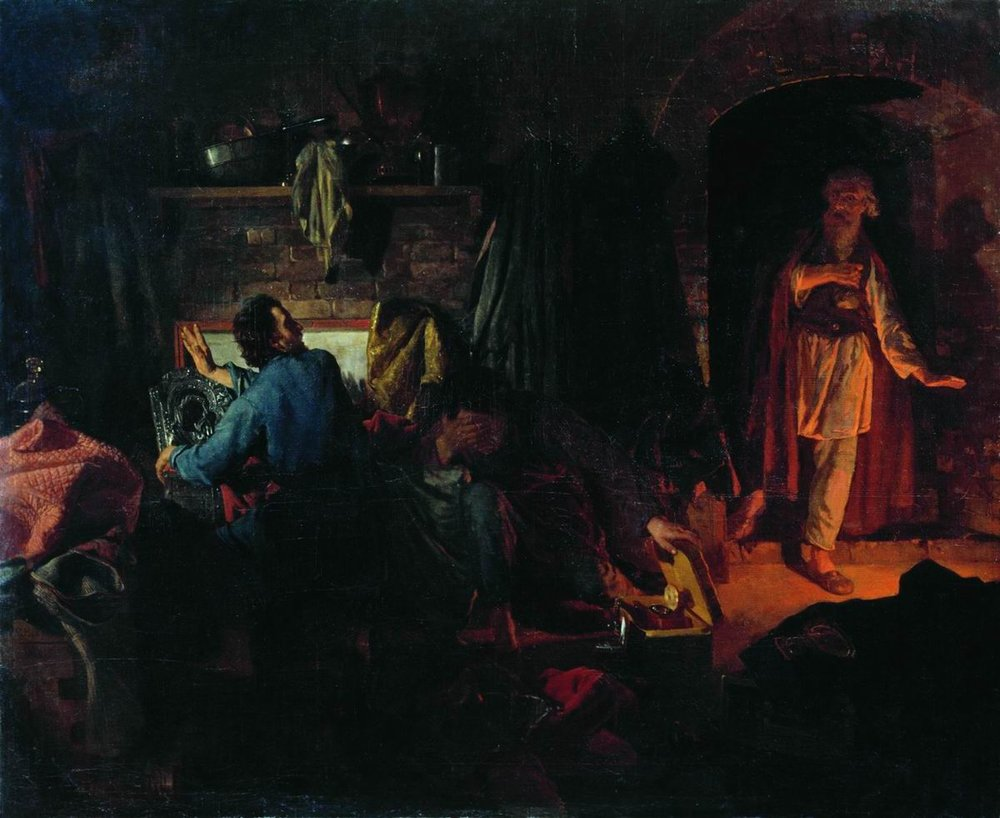
- Greedy Children by Nikolai Nevrev (1830-1904)
- Author: Leo Tolstoy
- Original title: Фальшивый купон
- Translator: Charles Theodore Hagberg Wright
- Language: Russian
- Genre: Fiction
- Publication date: 1911 (posthumously)
- Publication place: Russian Empire
- Media type: Print
- Dewey Decimal: 891.733
- LC Class: PG3366 .F3
- Original text: Фальшивый купон at Russian Wikisource
- Translation: The Forged Coupon at Wikisource

The Forged Coupon (Russian: Фальшивый купон, romanized: Fal'shivyi kupon) is a novella in two parts by Leo Tolstoy. Though he first conceived of the story in the late 1890s, he did not begin writing it until 1902. After struggling for several years, he finally completed the story in 1904; however, it was not published until some of Tolstoy's shorter works were collected and anthologized after his death in 1910.

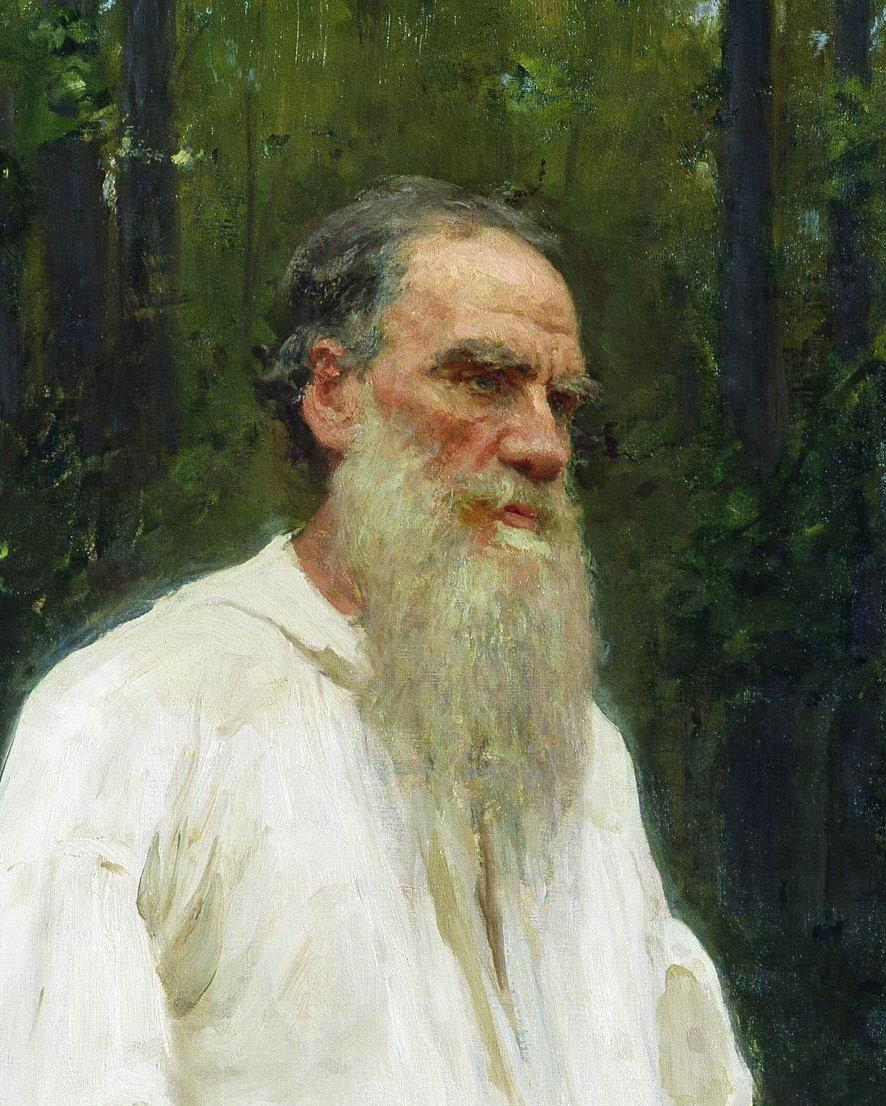
Tolstoy in 1901 (painted by Ilya Repin)

== Synopsis ==
The story is divided into two parts. In Part I, schoolboy Mitya is in desperate need of money to repay a debt, but his father angrily denies him assistance. Dejected, under the instigation of a friend Makhin, Mitya simply changes a 2.50 rouble bond coupon to read 12.50 roubles, but this one evil deed sets off a chain of events that affects the lives of dozens of others, when his one falsehood indirectly causes a man to murder a woman at the end of Part I, and then seek redemption through religion in Part II.

Having written the novella in his dying years, after his excommunication, Tolstoy relishes the chance to unveil the "pseudo-piety and hypocrisy of organized religion." Yet, he maintains an unwavering belief in man's capacity to find truth, so the story remains hopeful, especially in Part II, which shows that good works can affect another as in a domino effect, just as evil does in Part I. The novella has also been translated with the title "The Counterfeit Note" and "The Forged Banknote."

== Adaptations ==
Robert Bresson used Part I as the basis for his last film, L'Argent (1983), transposing the action from early nineteenth century tsarist Russia to capitalistic, present-day France. Bresson merges the characters of Ivan Mirinov and Stepán into "Yvon Targe", thus providing the ensemble cast with a concise protagonist and focusing more specifically in his story. Because Part II is completely omitted, there is no redeeming the many characters and their crimes that lead up to murder in Part I. The film Frozen Land (Finnish: Paha maa) is a 2005 critically acclaimed dark Finnish film drama directed and written by Aku Louhimies that is based on Part I and set in contemporary Finland.

== See also ==
Leo Tolstoy bibliography
