= The Devil Probably =

1977 French film by Robert Bresson

- Theatrical release poster
- Directed by: Robert Bresson
- Written by: Robert Bresson
- Produced by: Stéphane Tchalgadjieff
- Starring: Antoine Monnier; Tina Irissari; Henri de Maublanc; Laetitia Carcano; Nicolas Deguy; Régis Hanrion
- Cinematography: Pasqualino De Santis
- Edited by: Germaine Lamy
- Music by: Philippe Sarde
- Production company: Sunchild GMF/Michel Chanderli
- Distributed by: Gaumont Distribution
- Release date: 15 June 1977
- Running time: 95 minutes
- Country: France
- Language: French

The Devil Probably (French: Le Diable probablement), also spelled The Devil, Probably, is a 1977 French drama film directed by Robert Bresson. It was entered into the 27th Berlin International Film Festival, where it won the Silver Bear - Special Jury Prize. It was Bresson's penultimate work, preceding his 1983 film L'Argent.

== Plot ==
The film opens with two contradictory newspaper headlines informing us of Charles's death, shot in Père Lachaise Cemetery. Beginning six months previously, the remainder of the film examines the events leading up to this event, through flashbacks and the perspectives of those around him, especially his friends Michel, Alberte and Edwige.

Charles is a disillusioned student living in Paris. He is detached from society and struggles with a growing sense of alienation. The people around him, including his girlfriend Alberte and his other friends, do not understand his inner turmoil.

Charles finds no inspiration from left-wing politics or religion, nor from the work of his environmental activist friend, Michel. He finds a similar void in sex with Alberte and with another casual acquaintance. Psychoanalysis fails to repair his nihilistic outlook. He increasingly observes the world with a sense of unease and horror, and expresses a profound dissatisfaction with it.

He becomes more focused on the idea of suicide. During a discussion on a bus, a passenger asks "Who made this mockery of humanity? Who’s leading us by the nose?", and another replies "The devil probably".

Finally, Charles makes an arrangement with his drug-addicted friend Valentin to end his life using a handgun.

== Cast ==
- Antoine Monnier - Charles
- Tina Irissari - Alberte
- Henri de Maublanc - Michel
- Laetitia Carcano - Edwige
- Nicolas Deguy - Valentin
- Régis Hanrion - Dr. Mime
- Geoffroy Gaussen - bookseller
- Roger Honorat - police officer

== Production ==
"What impelled me to make this film is the mess we have made of everything. This mass civilisation in which the individual will soon no longer exist. This demented tampering with things. This immense demolition job in which we shall kill ourselves by trying to go on living. This incredible indifference shown by people, except for some of today’s youth who see things more clearly."

– Robert Bresson

The film is only Bresson's second original script after Au hasard Balthazar.

The commission which allocated advance funding to directors did not do so for Bresson, and the personal intervention of the Culture Minister, Michel Guy, was required for it to be financed.

The film was shot in Paris during the 1976 heatwave.

== Reception ==
Upon release, the film was banned in France for those aged under eighteen because of its suicidal themes.

It shared the Silver Bear - Special Jury Prize with two minor films at the 27th Berlin International Film Festival, but only after German film director Rainer Werner Fassbinder and British film critic Derek Malcolm had threatened to leave the jury if their support for it for the top prize were not made public. Fassbinder said:

Robert Bresson's Le Diable Probablement ... is the most shattering film I've seen in this Berlin Festival. I think it's a major film [...]. [I]n the future – and this world will probably last for another few thousand years – this film will be more important than all the rubbish which is now considered important but which never really goes deep enough[.] The questions Bresson asks will never be unimportant.

Fassbinder would go on to refer to the film in his own 1979 film Die Dritte Generation, where a character remarks that it is "a sad movie", but "so long as the movies are sad, our lives can stay funny".

The critic J. Hoberman described the film with one sentence: "A Dostoyevskian story of a tormented soul, presented in the stylized manner of a medieval illumination." Richard Hell described the film as "by far the most punk movie ever."

The film was well-received among critics, currently holding a 85% "fresh" rating on Rotten Tomatoes based on 20 reviews.

== See also ==
- List of French films of 1977
