= Saint-Priest-des-Champs =

- Commune
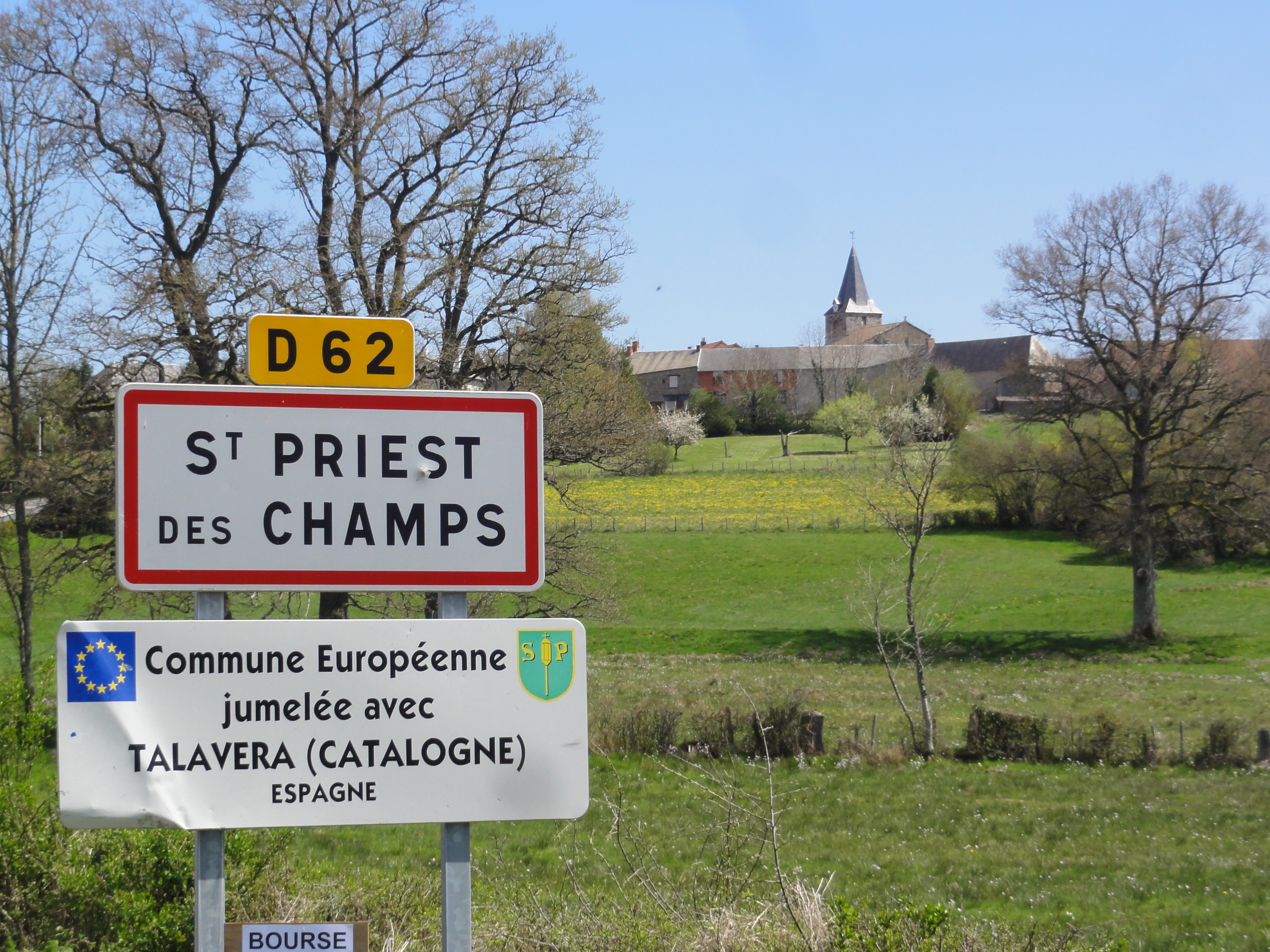
- A general view of Saint-Priest-des-Champs
- Location of Saint-Priest-des-Champs
- Location within France Location within Auvergne-Rhône-Alpes
- Coordinates: 45°59′35″N 2°45′54″E
- Country: France
- Region: Auvergne-Rhône-Alpes
- Department: Puy-de-Dôme
- Arrondissement: Riom
- Canton: Saint-Éloy-les-Mines
- Intercommunality: CC Pays de Saint-Éloy

Government
  - Mayor (2026–32): Bernard Favier
- Area^{1}: 45.09 km^{2} (17.41 sq mi)
- Elevation: 650 m (2,130 ft)
- Highest elevation: 716 m (2,349 ft)
- Lowest elevation: 500 m (1,600 ft)
- Population (2023): 736
  - Density: 16.3/km^{2} (42.3/sq mi)
- Time zone: UTC+01:00 (CET)
  - Summer (DST): UTC+02:00 (CEST)
- INSEE/Postal code: 63388 /63640
- ^{1} French Land Register data, which excludes lakes, ponds, glaciers > 1 km^{2} (0.386 sq mi or 247 acres) and river estuaries.

Saint-Priest-des-Champs (French pronunciation: [sɛ̃ pʁijɛ(st) de ʃɑ̃]) is a commune in the Puy-de-Dôme department in the Auvergne of central France.

== Geography ==
Saint-Priest-des-Champs is located some 25 km west of Combronde and 15 km north-west of Bromont-Lamothe. Access to the commune is by the D987 from Pontaumur in the south which passes through the length of the commune and the village before continuing north-east to Saint-Gervais-d'Auvergne. The D62 comes from Espinasse in the north-west and continues through the village south-east to Les Ancizes-Comps. The D515 also goes west from the village to Biollet. The D512 branches from the D987 at the south-western border of the commune and forms most of the southern border of the commune. The commune is mixed forest and farmland.

The south-eastern border of the commune is marked by the Sioule river which flows north forming a lake behind the dam just east of the commune. The north eastern border is formed by the Chalamont which flows south to join the Sioulet near the dam. The Coli rises in the west of the commune and flows east, south of the village, to join the Sioule. Many other streams rise in the commune and flow south-east to join the Sioule. Other streams rise in the west of the commune and join the Ruisseau de Coulet which flows south to join the Chevalet near Tingaud.

=== Localities and Hamlets ===
- Bargheon
- Beauffessoux le petit
- Beauffessoux le grand
- Blanquet
- Bois Redon
- Bois des Girauds
- Boscavert
- Bouchelet
- Buffevent
- Buige de la Roche
- Carton
- Champ Moise
- Chez Saby
- Chirol
- Cluzel
- Coulazède
- Couronnet
- Courtine
- Croix de Boissis
- Gandichoux
- Gaulme
- Grandsaigne
- Jouhet
- La Barge
- La Buchaille
- La Carte
- La Chomette
- Lacost
- La Couaire
- La Croizette
- La Force
- La Geneste
- La Georges
- La Mazière
- La Motte
- L'Arbre
- La Reine
- La Roche
- La Sauvolle
- Lasciouve
- Laussedat
- Laval
- La Vergne
- Lébeaupin
- Le Bladeix
- Le Davideix
- Le Marais
- Le Moulin du Bay
- Le Moulin de Laval
- Le Moulin de l'Étang Grand
- Le Puy Gotier
- Le Pradeix
- Le Puy
- Le Sagnard
- Les Barsses
- Les Chaussades
- Les Chomets
- Les Communaux
- Les Eaux Minérales
- Le Signolet
- Lespadys
- Les Paris
- Les Pâturaux
- Les Rioux
- Les Sandes
- Les Treux
- Le Teilhot
- Marcheix
- Mazeron
- Montpied
- Pas de Saint-Martin
- Pérol
- Pont de Fourche
- Puy de Beix
- Ragheade
- Retaillat
- Roudadoux
- Ruderre
- Sous la Roche
- Sous le Bois
- Vernadel
- Villemaine
- Visignol

=== Neighbouring communes and villages ===
Source:

== Administration ==
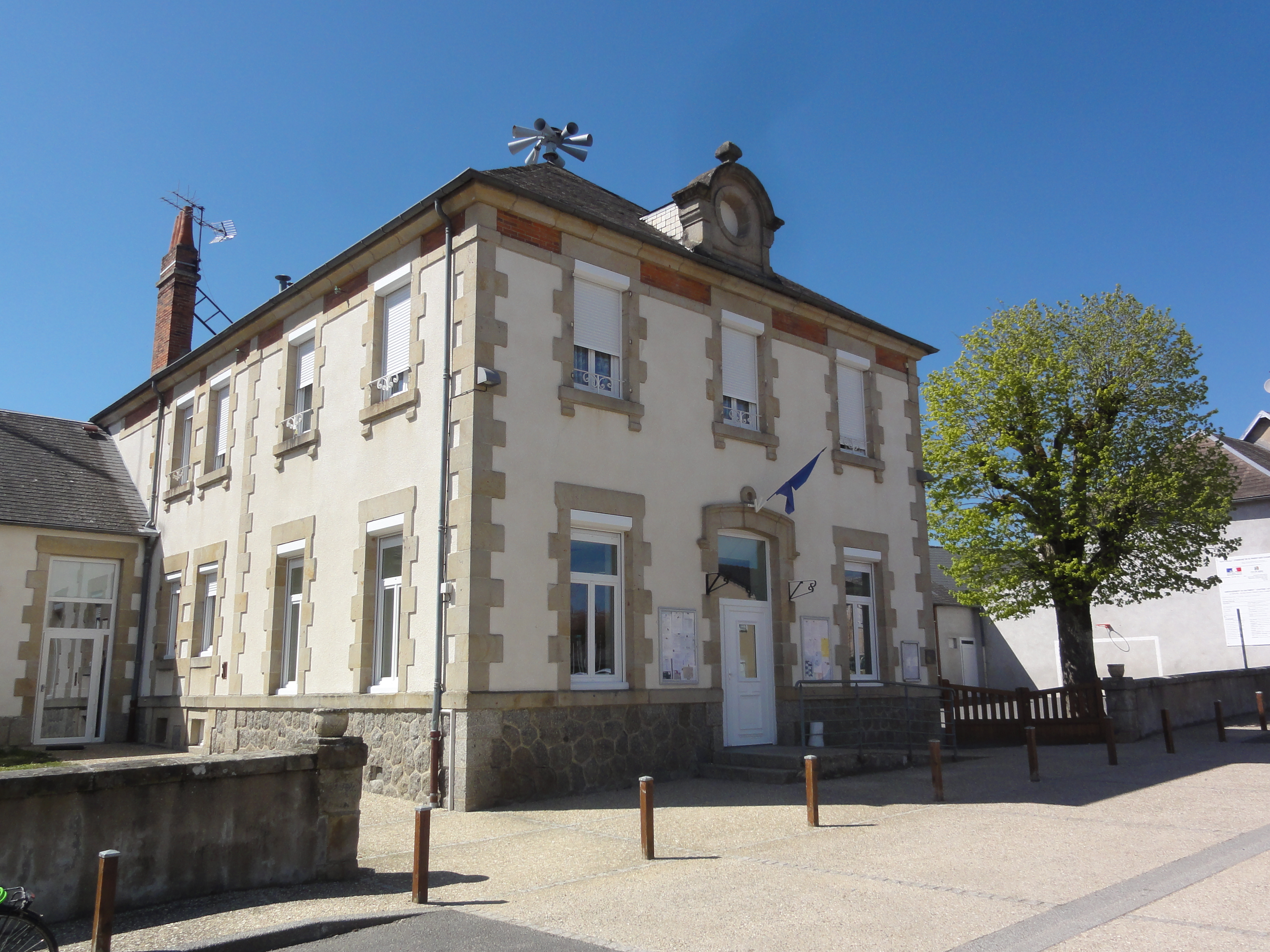
Saint-Priest-des-Champs Town Hall

List of Successive Mayors

From	To	Name
2001	2026	Bernard Favier

=== Twinning ===
Saint-Priest-des-Champs has twinning associations with:

- Hohentengen (Germany) since 1986.

== Demography ==
The inhabitants of the commune are known as Saint-Priestois or Saint-Priestoises in French.

Historical population

Year	Pop.	±% p.a.
1793	1,983	—
1800	1,873	−0.81%
1806	1,946	+0.64%
1821	1,892	−0.19%
1831	1,981	+0.46%
1836	2,159	+1.74%
1841	2,202	+0.40%
1846	2,259	+0.51%
1851	2,253	−0.05%
1856	2,126	−1.15%
1861	2,062	−0.61%
1866	1,972	−0.89%
1872	1,974	+0.02%
1876	1,960	−0.18%
1881	1,919	−0.42%
1886	1,943	+0.25%
1891	1,853	−0.94%
1896	1,797	−0.61%
1901	1,760	−0.42%

Year	Pop.	±% p.a.
1906	1,814	+0.61%
1911	1,766	−0.53%
1921	1,527	−1.44%
1926	1,382	−1.98%
1931	1,335	−0.69%
1936	1,254	−1.24%
1946	1,165	−0.73%
1954	1,024	−1.60%
1962	1,009	−0.18%
1968	1,026	+0.28%
1975	800	−3.49%
1982	710	−1.69%
1990	662	−0.87%
1999	678	+0.27%
2007	697	+0.35%
2012	741	+1.23%
2017	702	−1.08%
2023	736	+0.79%

Source: EHESS and INSEE

== Culture and heritage ==
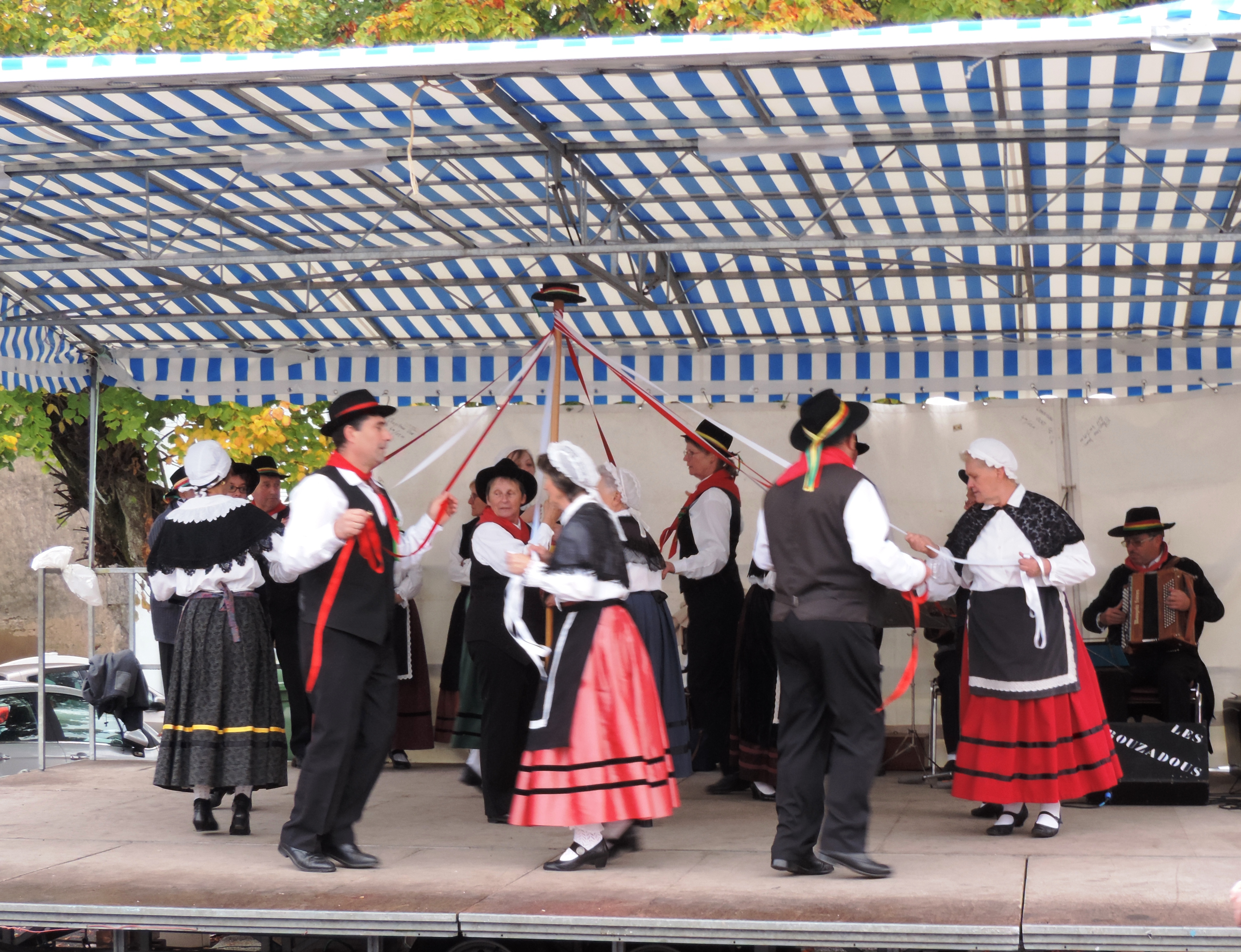
A Bourrée in Saint-Priest-des-Champs

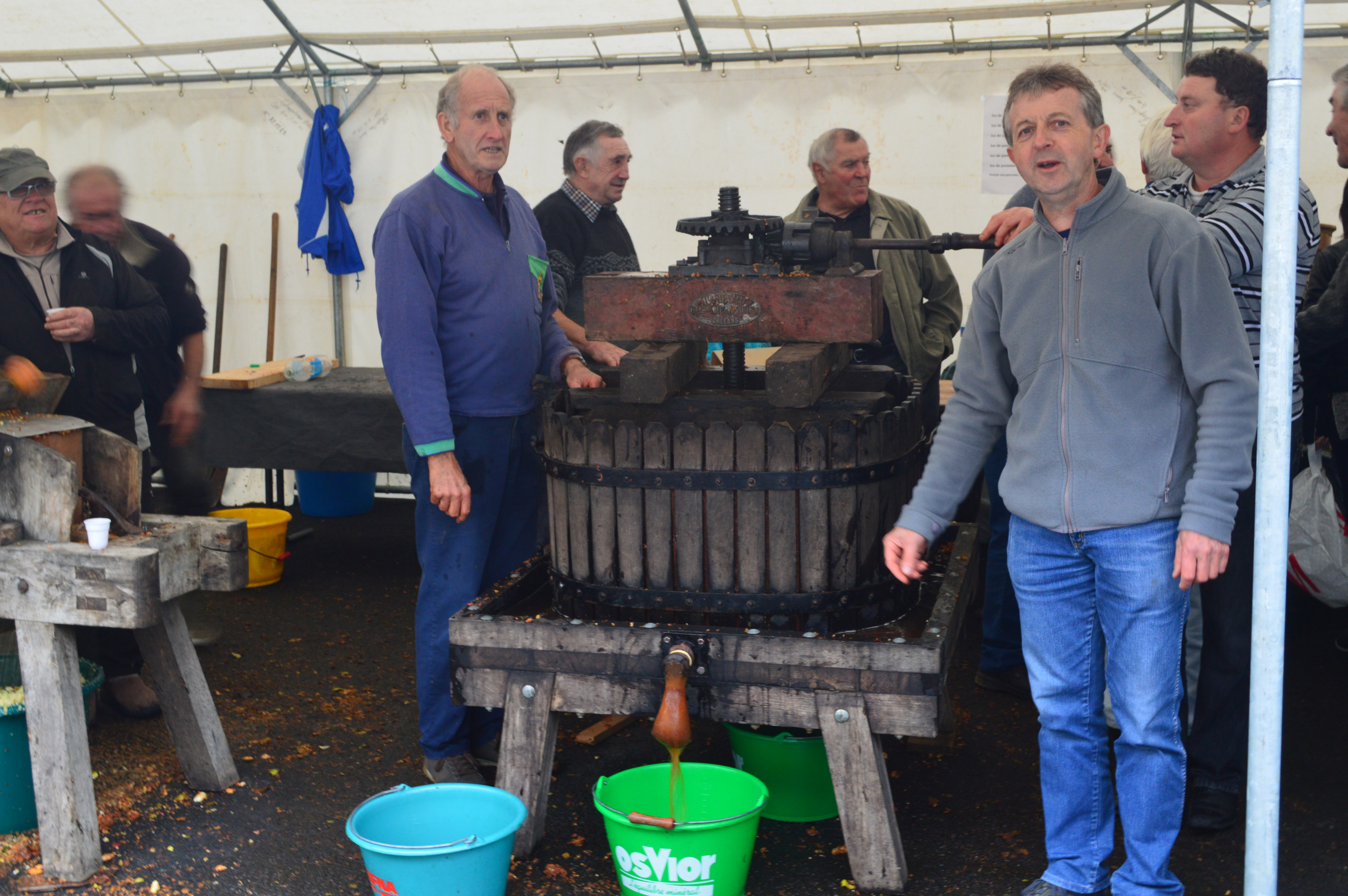
Traditional Cider-making in Saint-Priest-des-Champs

- The Church of the Nativity of Saint John the Baptist
- The War Memorial
- Many Wayside Crosses

There is a Bourrée or dance called Bourrée de Saint-Priest (also known as Les garçons maçons). Many of these popular dance tunes, usually untitled and anonymous, have often been "renamed" in their collection, or interpretation, or the name of the collection place.

=== Saint-Priest-des-Champs Picture Gallery ===
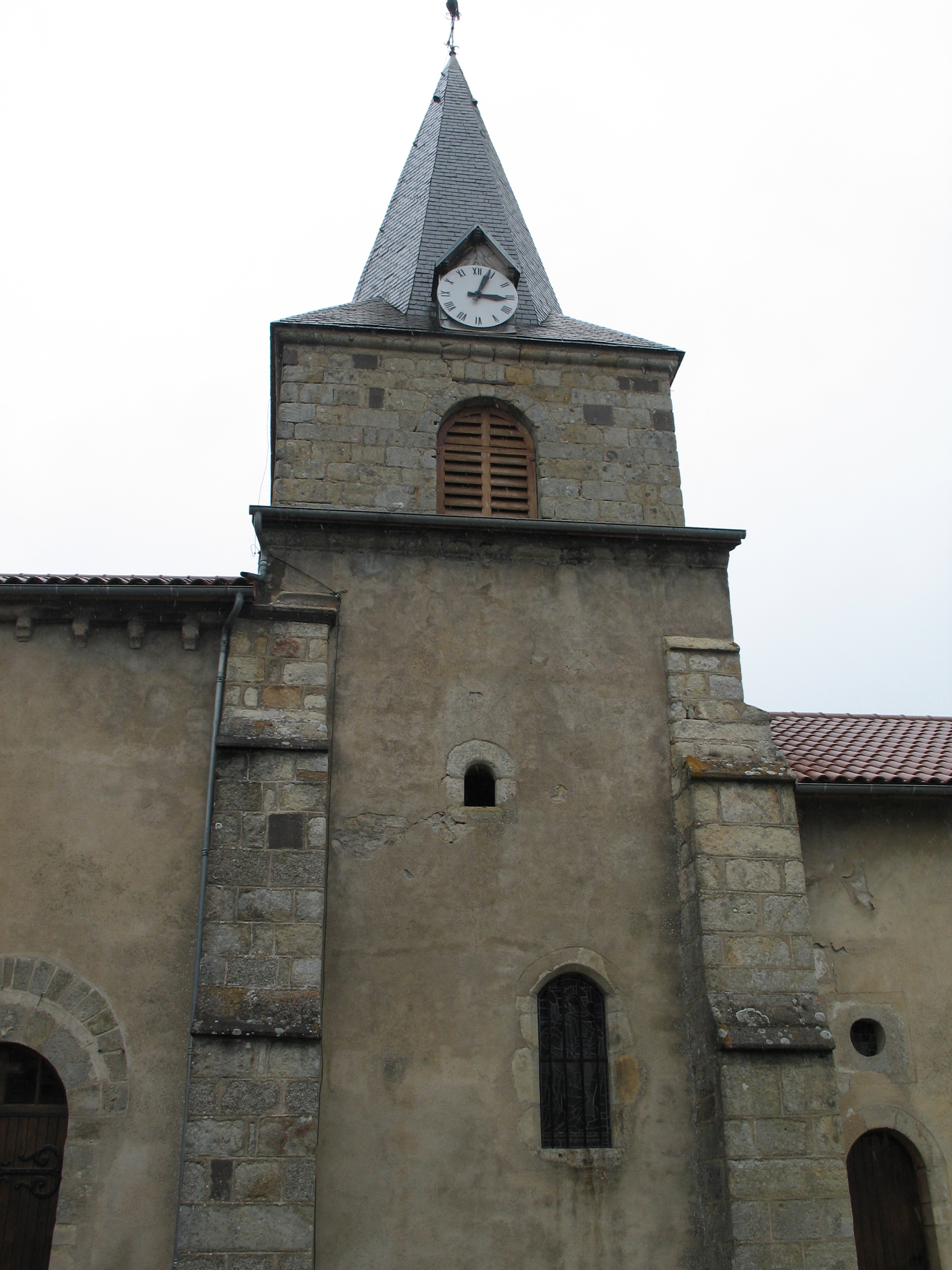
The Church of the Nativity

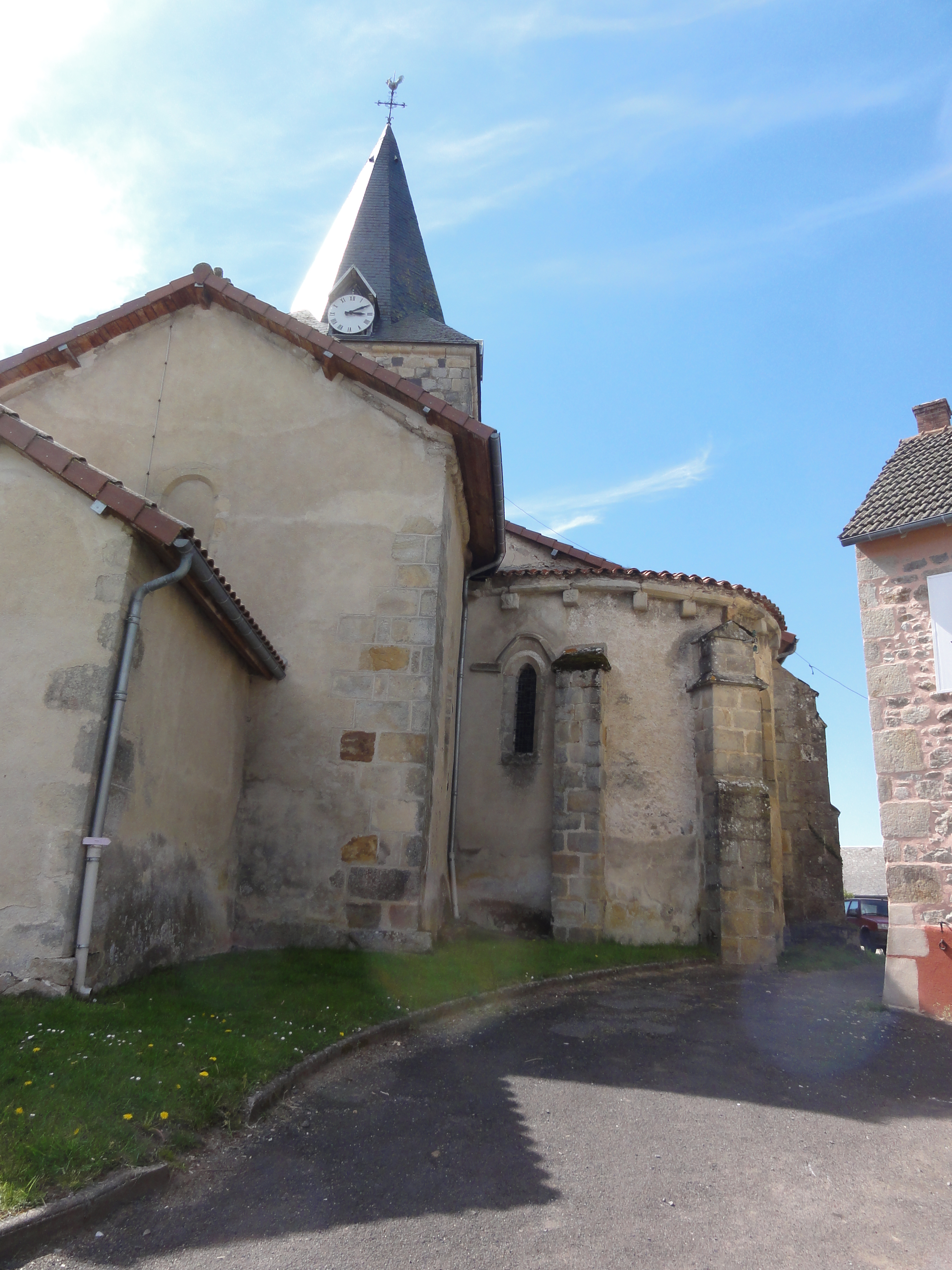
The Chevet

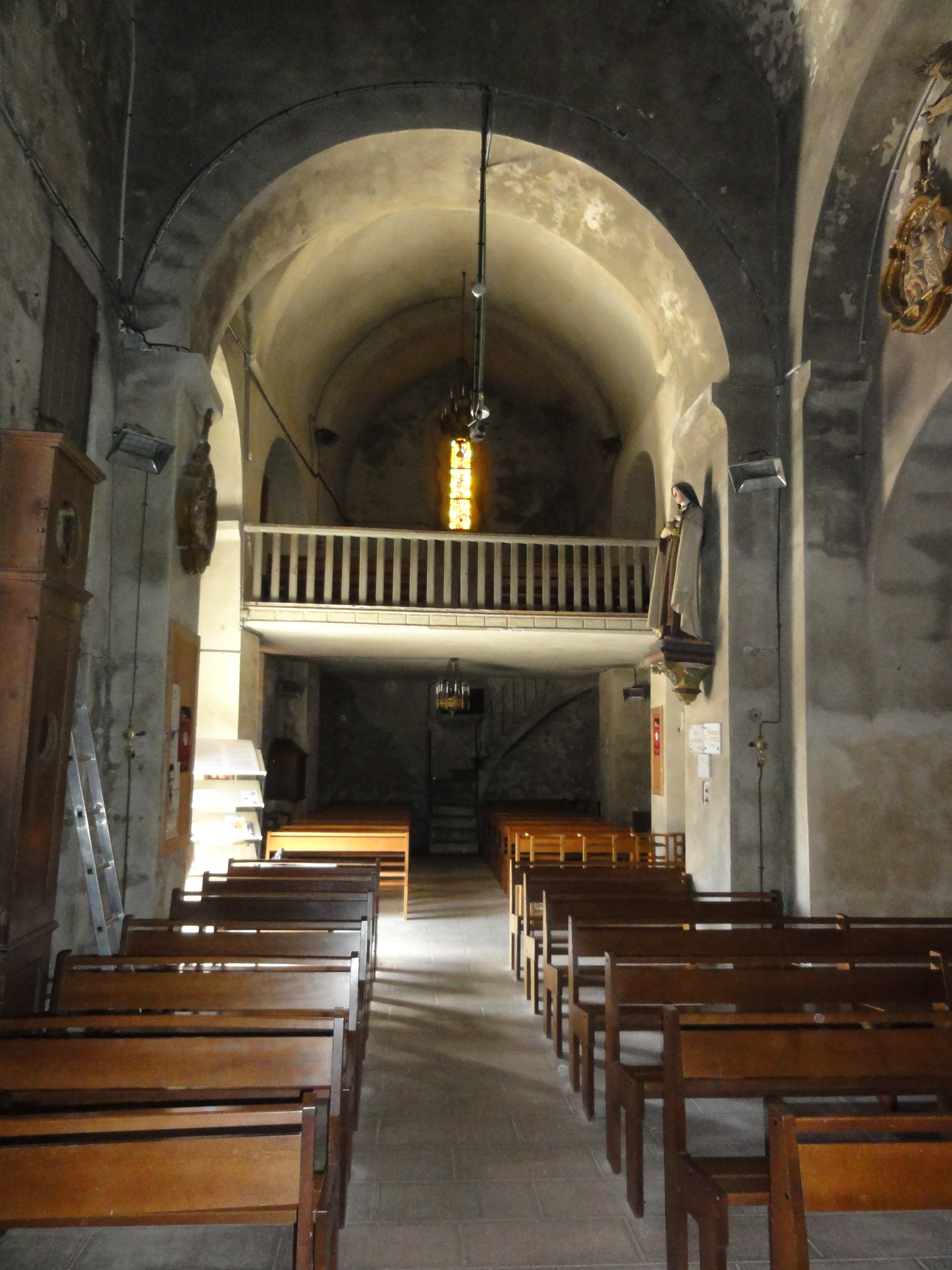
The Church Nave and Tribune

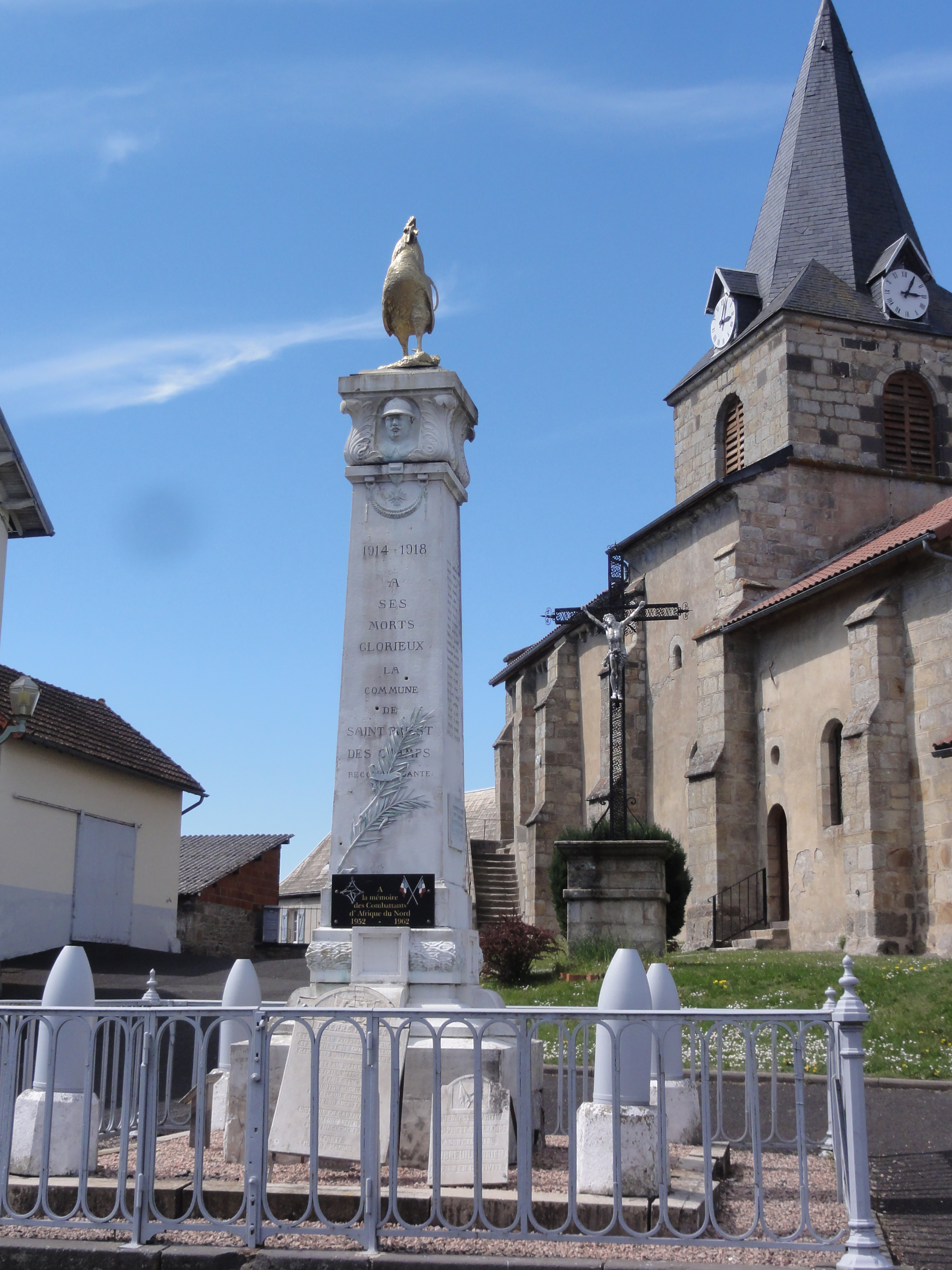
The War Memorial

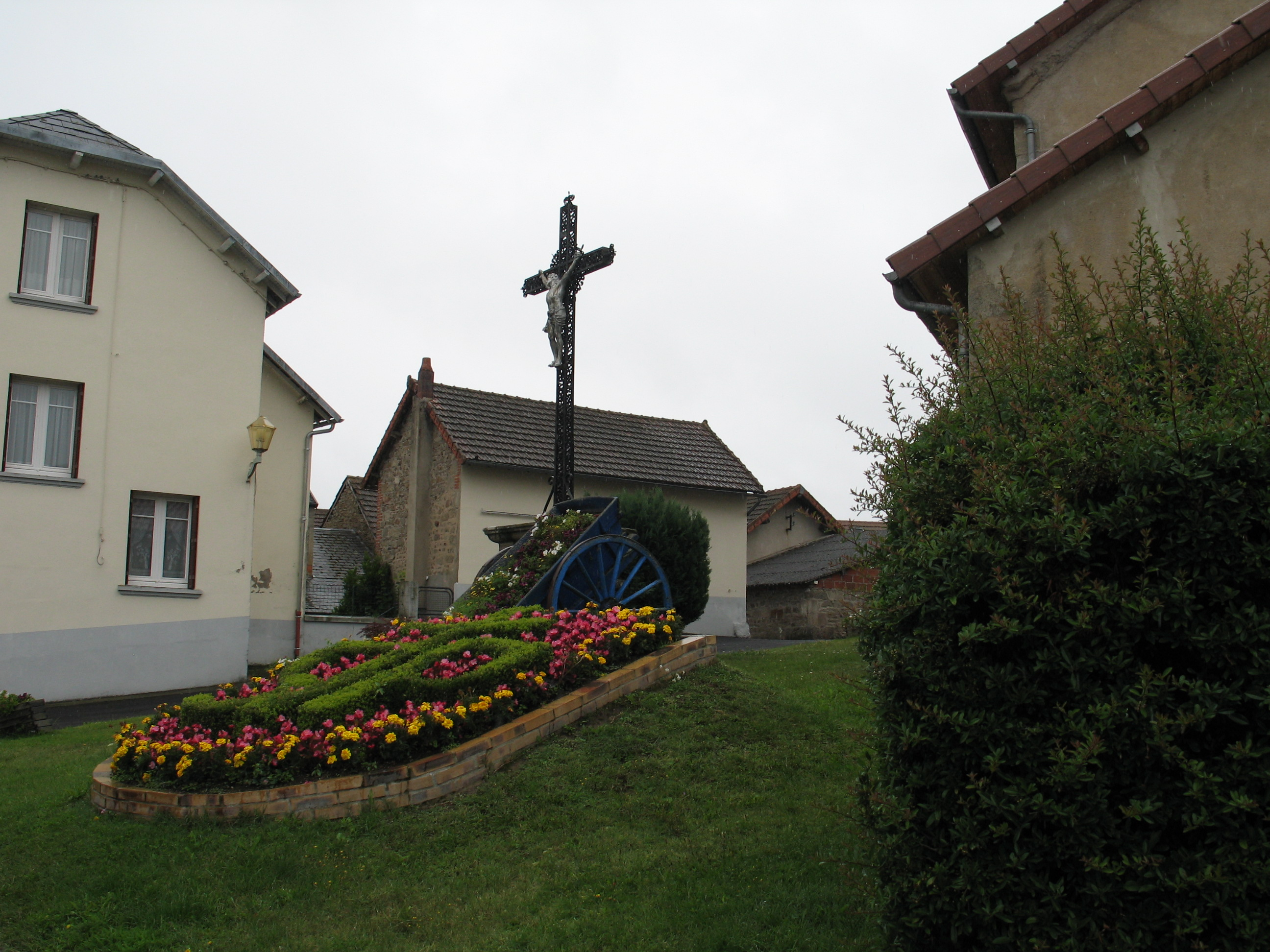
A Wayside Cross in the Town Square

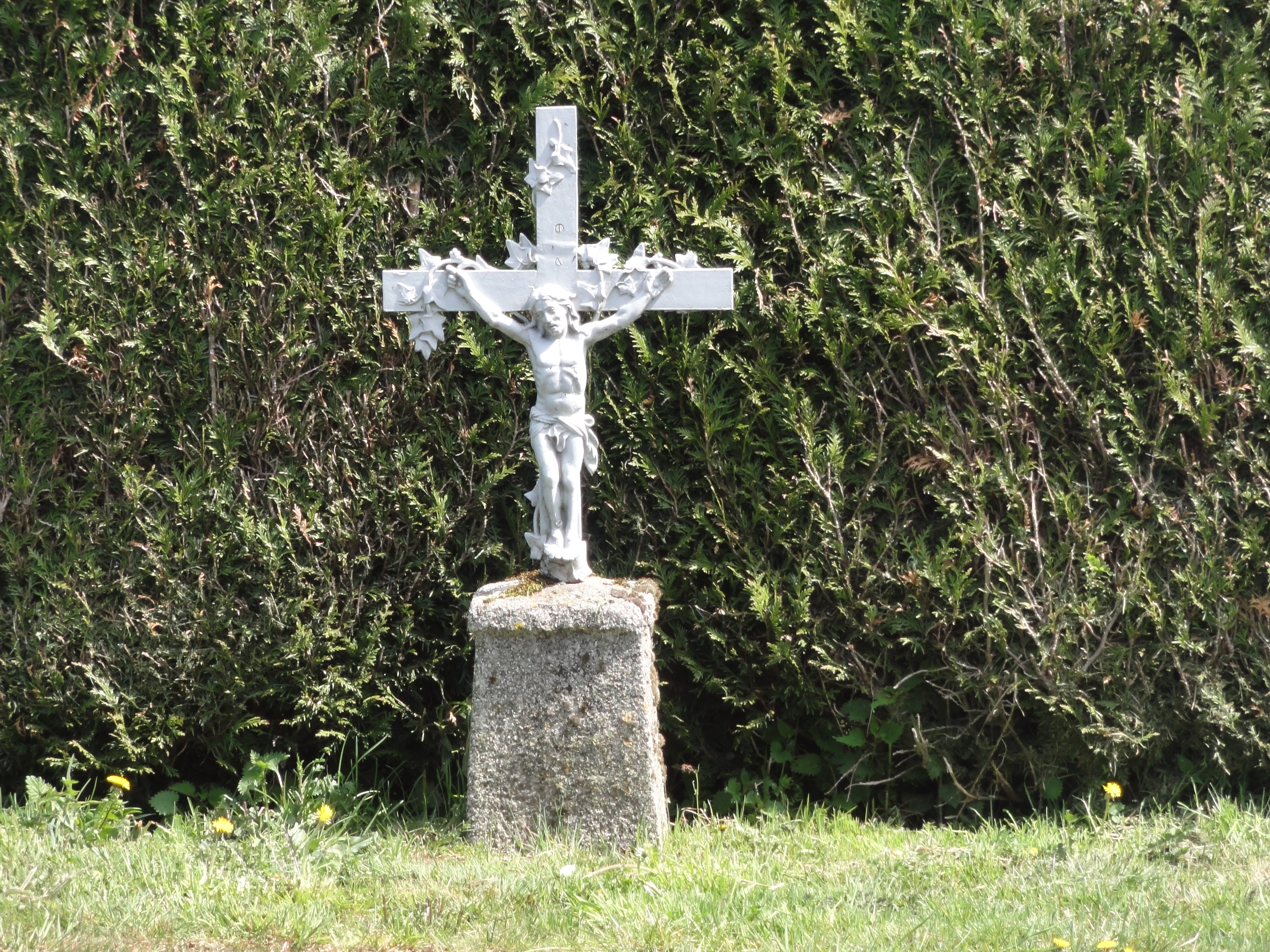
A Wayside Cross on the D62

== See also ==
- Communes of the Puy-de-Dôme department
