= Robert Bresson =

French filmmaker (1901–1999)

- Bresson c. 1960
- Born: 25 September 1901; Bromont-Lamothe, France
- Died: 18 December 1999 (aged 98); Droue-sur-Drouette, France
- Occupations: Film director; screenwriter
- Years active: 1933–1983
- Spouse(s): Leidia van der Zee (m. 1926); Marie-Madeleine van der Mersch

Robert Bresson (French: [ʁɔbɛʁ bʁɛsɔ̃]; 25 September 1901 – 18 December 1999) was a French filmmaker. Known for his ascetic approach, Bresson made a notable contribution to the art of cinema; his non-professional actors, ellipses, and sparse use of scoring have led his works to be regarded as preeminent examples of minimalist film. Much of his work is known for being tragic in story and nature.

Bresson is among the most highly regarded filmmakers of all time. He has the highest number of films (seven) that made the 2012 Sight and Sound critics' poll of the Greatest Films of All Time. His works A Man Escaped (1956), Pickpocket (1959) and Au hasard Balthazar (1966) were ranked among the top 100, and other films like Mouchette (1967) and L'Argent (1983) also received many votes. Jean-Luc Godard once wrote, "He is the French cinema, as Dostoevsky is the Russian novel and Mozart is German music."

== Life and career ==
Bresson was born at Bromont-Lamothe, Puy-de-Dôme, the son of Marie-Élisabeth (née Clausels) and Léon Bresson. Little is known of his early life. He was educated at Lycée Lakanal in Sceaux, Hauts-de-Seine, close to Paris, and turned to painting after graduating. Three formative influences in his early life are evident in his films: Catholicism, art, and his experiences as a prisoner of war. Robert Bresson lived in Paris, France, in the Île Saint-Louis.

Initially a photographer, Bresson made his first short film, Les affaires publiques (Public Affairs) in 1934. He enlisted in the French Army on the onset of World War II and was captured by the Germans in 1940 and held as a prisoner of war for more than a year, an experience which informed A Man Escaped. In a career that spanned fifty years, Bresson made only 13 feature-length films. This reflects his painstaking approach to the filmmaking process and his non-commercial preoccupations. Difficulty finding funding for his projects was also a factor.

Bresson was sometimes accused of an uncompromising "ivory tower existence" outside of mainstream cinema. Later in his life, he said that he had stopped watching other filmmakers' movies in theaters, although he later praised the James Bond film For Your Eyes Only (1981), saying that "It filled me with wonder ... if I could have seen it twice in a row and again the next day, I would have." Critic Jonathan Rosenbaum, an admirer of Bresson's work, argued that the filmmaker was "a mysterious, aloof figure", and wrote that on the set of Four Nights of a Dreamer (1971), where Rosenbaum was an extra, the director "seemed more isolated from his crew than any other filmmaker I've seen at work; his widow and onetime assistant director, Mylene van der Mersch, often conveyed his instructions."

Bresson died on 18 December 1999, at his home in Droue-sur-Drouette, southwest of Paris. He was 98. He made his last film, L'Argent (Money), in 1983 and had been unwell for some time.

== Themes and style ==
=== Artistic minimalism ===
Bresson published a collection of aphorisms and reflections in 1975 titled Notes on the Cinematographer (French: Notes sur le cinématographe), in which he argues for a unique sense of the term "cinematography". For him, cinematography is the higher function of cinema. While a movie is in essence "only" filmed theatre, Bresson defines cinematography as an attempt to create a new language of moving images and sounds. His early artistic focus was to separate the language of cinema from that of the theater, which often relies heavily upon the actor's performance to drive the work. Film scholar Tony Pipolo writes that "Bresson opposed not just professional actors, but acting itself," preferring to think of his actors as 'models'. In Notes on the Cinematographer, Bresson succinctly defines the difference between the two:

HUMAN MODELS: movement from the exterior to the interior. [...]
ACTORS: movement from the interior to the exterior.

Bresson further elaborates on his disdain for acting by appropriating a remark Chateaubriand had made about 19th century poets and applying it to actors: "what they lack is not naturalness, but Nature." For Bresson, "to think it's more natural for a movement to be made or a phrase to be said like this than like that" is "absurd", and "nothing rings more false in film [...] than the overstudied sentiments" of theater.

With his 'model' technique, Bresson's actors were required to repeat multiple takes of each scene until all semblances of 'performance' were stripped away, leaving a stark effect that registers as both subtle and raw. This, as well as Bresson's restraint in musical scoring, would have a significant influence on minimalist cinema. In the academic journal CrossCurrents, Shmuel Ben-gad wrote:

There is a credibility in Bresson's models: They are like people we meet in life, more or less opaque creatures who speak, move, and gesture [...] Acting, on the other hand, no matter how naturalistic, actively deforms or invents by putting an overlay or filter over the person, presenting a simplification of a human being and not allowing the camera to capture the actor's human depths. Thus what Bresson sees as the essence of filmic art, the achievement of the creative transformation involved in all art through the interplay of images of real things, is destroyed by the artifice of acting. For Bresson, then, acting is, like mood music and expressive camera work, just one more way of deforming reality or inventing that has to be avoided.

Film critic Roger Ebert wrote that Bresson's directorial style resulted in films "of great passion: Because the actors didn't act out the emotions, the audience could internalize them." In Against Interpretation, Susan Sontag wrote that "Some art aims directly at arousing the feelings; some art appeals to the feelings through the route of the intelligence ... art that detaches, that provokes reflection. In the film, the master of the reflective mode is Robert Bresson." Sontag said that "the form of Bresson's films is designed (like Ozu's) to discipline the emotions at the same time that it arouses them: to induce a certain tranquility in the spectator, a state of spiritual balance that is itself the subject of the film."

=== Catholicism ===
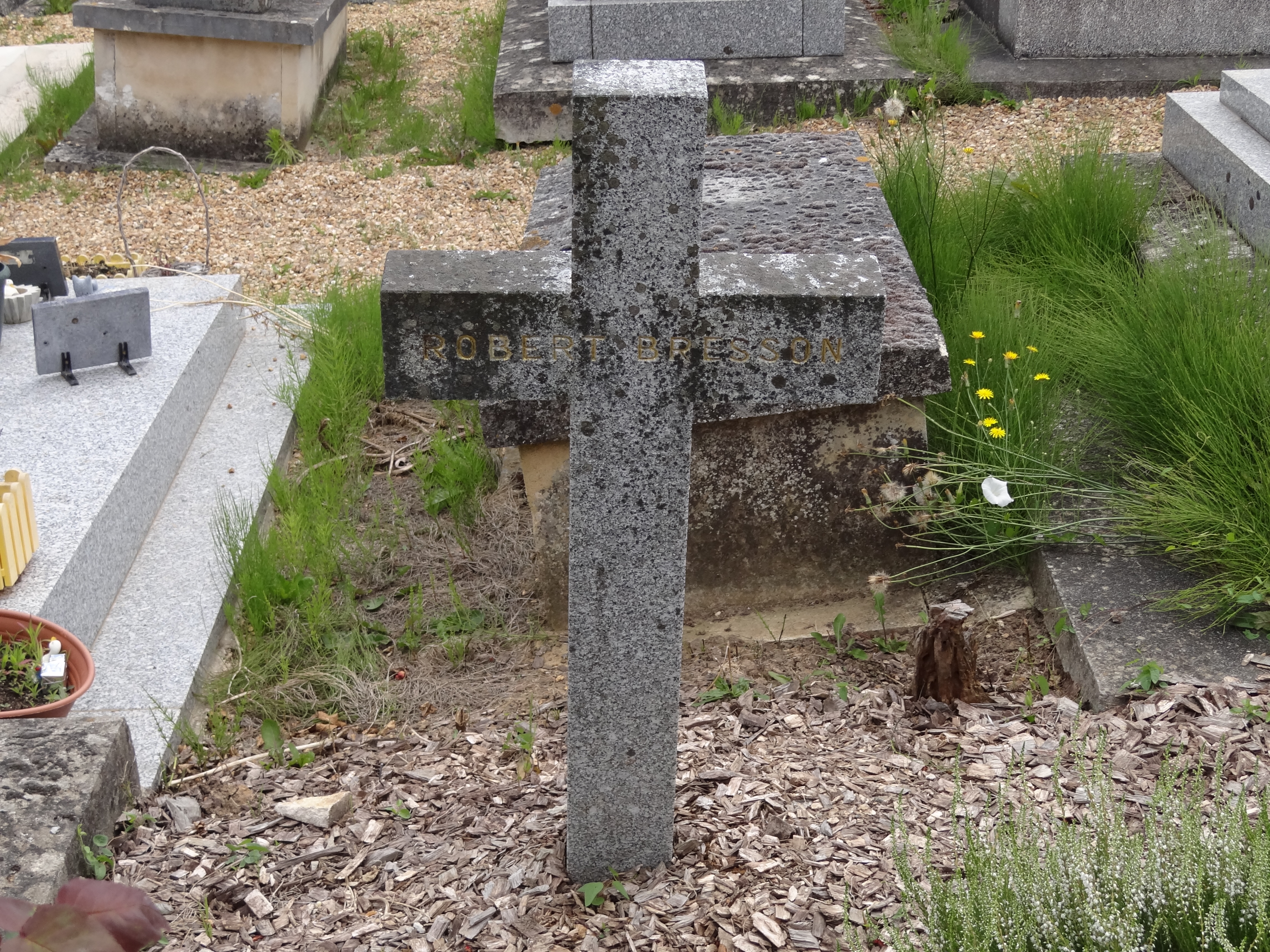
Bresson's grave in Droue-sur-Drouette, France.

Bresson was a Catholic, although he disagreed with some points of Catholic theology, explaining that he was not sure of the resurrection of the body and "would rather be a Jansenist than Jesuit" due to his belief in predestination. In his later life he stopped attending church services due to his dissatisfaction with the Second Vatican Council's transition to the Mass of Paul VI, explaining that while he still felt a sense of transcendence sitting in a cathedral, Vatican II's changes to the Mass made it harder for him to feel the presence of God. Although several writers claim that Bresson described himself as a "Christian atheist", it is not known in what context he made that statement (if he ever did).

In 1973, Bresson explained:

There is the feeling that God is everywhere, and the more I live, the more I see that in nature, in the country. When I see a tree, I see that God exists. I try to catch and to convey the idea that we have a soul and that the soul is in contact with God. That's the first thing I want to get in my films.

In a 1976 interview with Paul Schrader, Bresson said that he was concerned by what he saw as "the collapse of the Catholic religion" in France. He did not believe the post-Vatican II Church was capable of responding to this challenge. The Devil Probably incorporates some of his criticisms of the post-Vatican II Church. Bresson explained that his youthful protagonist "is looking for something on top of life, but he doesn't find it. He goes to Church to seek it, and he doesn't find it." In addition, an early scene in the film shows a young Catholic complaining that the post-Vatican II Church "run[s] after Protestants."

Some feel that Bresson's Catholic upbringing and belief system lie behind the thematic structures of most of his films. Recurring themes under this interpretation include salvation, redemption, defining and revealing the human soul, and metaphysical transcendence of a limiting and materialistic world. An example is A Man Escaped (1956), where a seemingly simple plot of a prisoner of war's escape can be read as a metaphor for the mysterious process of salvation. However, Bresson's films are also critiques of French society and the wider world, with each revealing the director's sympathetic, if unsentimental, view of society's victims. That the main characters of Bresson's most contemporary films, The Devil, Probably (1977) and L'Argent (1983), reach similarly unsettling conclusions about life indicates the director's feelings towards the culpability of modern society in the dissolution of individuals. Of an earlier protagonist, he said, "Mouchette offers evidence of misery and cruelty. She is found everywhere: wars, concentration camps, tortures, assassinations." Film historian Mark Cousins argues that "If Bergman and Fellini filmed life as if it was a theatre and a circus, respectively, Bresson's microcosm was that of a prison", describing Bresson's characters as "psychologically imprisoned".

Bresson explained that his films often address secular themes because he believed that a secular film with religious undercurrents was more likely to resonate with modern filmgoers than an explicitly religious theme. Susan Sontag wrote that in his films, while a "religious vocation supplies one setting for ideas about gravity, lucidity, and martyrdom, ... the drastically secular subjects of crime, the revenge of betrayed love, and solitary imprisonment also yield the same themes." Bresson worried that the new French generation was too materialistic to harbor true religious belief, saying that "every religion is poverty and poverty is the way of having contact with mystery and with God. When Catholicism wants to be materialistic, God is not there." He tried to reach modern audiences indirectly, explaining, "the more life is what it is—ordinary, simple—without pronouncing the word 'God,' the more I see the presence of God in that. ... I don't want to shoot something in which God would be too transparent." In his work, "there is a presence of something which I call God, but I don't want to show it too much. I prefer to make people feel it."

In a 1983 interview for TSR's Spécial Cinéma, Bresson declared that he had been interested in making a film based on the Book of Genesis, although he believed such a production would be too costly and time-consuming. He first began developing ideas for the project in the 1960s and got backing from Dino de Laurentiis, but his attempt to start production in the 1980s ran out of funds.

== Legacy ==
Bresson is often referred to as a "patron saint" of cinema, not only for the strong Catholic themes found throughout his oeuvre, but also for his notable contributions to the art of film. His style can be detected through his use of sound, associating selected sounds with images or characters; paring dramatic form to its essentials by the spare use of music; and through his infamous 'actor-model' methods of directing his almost exclusively non-professional actors. Mark Cousins writes:

So complete was Bresson's rejection of cinema norms that he has a tendency to fall outside film history. However, his uncompromising stance has been extremely influential in some quarters.

Bresson's book Notes on the Cinematographer (1975) is one of the most respected books on film theory and criticism. His theories about film greatly influenced other filmmakers, particularly the French New Wave directors.

=== French cinema ===
Opposing the established pre-war French cinema (known as Tradition de la Qualité ["tradition of quality"]) by offering his own personal responses to the question "what is cinema?", and by formulating his ascetic style, Bresson gained a high reputation with the founders of the French New Wave. He is often listed (along with Alexandre Astruc and André Bazin) as one of the main figures who influenced them. New Wave pioneers praised Bresson and posited him as a prototype for or precursor to the movement. However, Bresson was neither as overtly experimental nor as outwardly political as the New Wave filmmakers, and his religious views (Catholicism and Jansenism) were not attractive to most of the filmmakers associated with the movement.

In his development of auteur theory, François Truffaut lists Bresson among the few directors to whom the term "auteur" can genuinely be applied, and later names him as one of the only examples of directors who could approach even the so-called "unfilmable" scenes, using the film narrative at its disposal. Jean-Luc Godard also looked upon Bresson with high admiration ("Robert Bresson is French cinema, as Dostoevsky is the Russian novel and Mozart is the German music.") Screenwriter and director Alain Cavalier describes Bresson's role as pivotal not only in the New Wave movement, but for French cinema in general, writing, "In French cinema you have a father and a mother: the father is Bresson and the mother is Renoir, with Bresson representing the strictness of the law and Renoir warmth and generosity. All the better French cinema has and will have to connect to Bresson in some way."

=== Reception and influence ===
Bresson has also influenced a number of other filmmakers, including Andrei Tarkovsky, Chantal Akerman, Jean Eustache, Abel Ferrara, Philippe Garrel, Hal Hartley, Monte Hellman, Jim Jarmusch, Louis Malle, Michael Haneke, Olivier Assayas, Atom Egoyan, the Dardenne brothers, Aki Kaurismäki, and Paul Schrader, whose book Transcendental Style in Film: Ozu, Bresson, Dreyer includes a detailed critical analysis. The Swedish filmmaker Ingmar Bergman praised and admired Bresson's films such as Mouchette and Diary of a Country Priest, the latter cited as an influence on his film Winter Light, although he disliked Au hasard Balthazar. The French filmmaker Jean Cocteau held Bresson in high regard. The French filmmaker Alain Resnais was a strong admirer of Bresson and his work. The French filmmaker Jean-Pierre Melville was also fond of Bresson and his work. The French filmmaker Jacques Rivette has acknowledged Bresson’s influence on his own films and called Bresson’s Les Dames du Bois de Boulogne one of "the key French film[s] for our generation." The French director Jacques Demy was inspired by Bresson’s film Les Dames du Bois de Boulogne and he even paid tribute to it in his own film Lola, which also starred Élina Labourdette. The Polish filmmaker Krzysztof Kieślowski was also influenced by him and ranked Bresson's film, A Man Escaped as one of the top ten films that "affected" him the most. The Italian filmmaker Michelangelo Antonioni was influenced by Bresson's film Les Dames du Bois de Boulogne. The German filmmaker Werner Herzog praised Bresson's films such as Pickpocket and Au hasard Balthazar. The American film director John Waters praised Bresson's film Lancelot du Lac. The Hungarian filmmaker Béla Tarr was influenced by Bresson and listed Bresson film Au hasard Balthazar on his top ten films of all time. The Iranian filmmaker Abbas Kiarostami was highly influenced by Bresson and mentioned the personal importance of Bresson's book, Notes on the Cinematographer. The Greek filmmaker Theo Angelopoulos listed Bresson's film Pickpocket on his top ten films of all time. The German director Wim Wenders praised and admired Bresson's films such as Au Hasard Balthazar and Mouchette, which were influential to his film career. The American director Stan Brakhage admired, analyzed, and gave lectures on Bresson's films, such as Pickpocket, Diary of a Country Priest, and Au hasard Balthazar.

The German filmmaker Rainer Werner Fassbinder was influenced by Bresson and championed and paid homage to Bresson's film The Devil Probably with his film The Third Generation. When Fassbinder was a member of the jury in the 1977 Berlin Film Festival, he even went so far as to threaten to leave the jury (when his enthusiasm was not shared by his peers) unless his appreciation for Bresson's film was made known to the public. The Italian filmmaker Bernardo Bertolucci greatly admired Bresson's work and personally told him that he adored his film Les Dames du Bois de Boulogne. The Spanish filmmaker Victor Erice was so inspired by Bresson’s work that he wrote a testimonial describing his impact on him and even called himself a "Spanish Bressonian." The Dardenne brothers's film L'Enfant was influenced by Bresson's film Pickpocket. The German director Margarethe von Trotta lists Bresson as one of her favorite directors. The American filmmaker Wes Anderson listed Au hasard Balthazar as one of his favorite films in the Criterion Collection library and called Bresson's film Mouchette, "terrific". The American filmmaker Richard Linklater was influenced by Bresson's work and listed Au hasard Balthazar and Pickpocket in his top 10 film list from the Criterion Collection. The British-American filmmaker Christopher Nolan was influenced by Bresson's films (specifically Pickpocket and A Man Escaped) for his film, Dunkirk. The Greek filmmaker Yorgos Lanthimos listed Bresson as one of his favorite filmmakers and picked Pickpocket as "the most moving film I've ever seen". Benny Safdie named the Bresson's film A Man Escaped as his favorite film of all time. Martin Scorsese praised Bresson as "one of the cinema's greatest artists" and an influence on his films such as Taxi Driver. Andrei Tarkovsky held Bresson in very high regard, noting him and Ingmar Bergman as his two favourite filmmakers, and stating: "I am only interested in the views of two people: one is called Bresson and one called Bergman." In his book Sculpting in Time, Tarkovsky describes Bresson as "perhaps the only artist in cinema, who achieved the perfect fusion of the finished work with a concept theoretically formulated beforehand."

=== Rankings over time ===
Although the number of films listed in the decennial Sight and Sound poll has changed over time, Bresson has normally been well-represented in these polls. The following table represents the critics' poll, not the related directors' poll. Only rankings above #250 are listed.

Film (English title)	1952	1962	1972	1982	1992	2002	2012	2022
The Ladies of the Bois de Boulogne	21	47	87	80	217	131		
Balthazar, at Random			32	131	62	20	16	25
Pickpocket		26	155	217	31	131	63	136
A Man Escaped			155	131	217	131	69	95
Mouchette			18	80			118	243
Money				217	62	62	109	169
Diary of a Country Priest		47	87	80	131	227	144	
The Devil Probably							201	
A Gentle Woman					217			

== Works ==
=== Filmography ===
Year	Film	English Title	Director	Writer	Notes
1933	C'était un musicien	He Was a Musician	No	Yes	
1934	Les Affaires publiques	Public Affairs	Yes	Yes	Short film; also editor
1936	Les Jumeaux de Brighton	The Brighton Twins	No	Yes	
1937	Courier sud	Southern Mail	No	Yes	
1938	La Vierge folle	The Foolish Virgin	No	No	Assistant director
1943	Les Anges du péché	Angels of Sin	Yes	Yes	
1945	Les Dames du Bois de Boulogne	The Ladies of the Bois de Boulogne	Yes	Yes	
1951	Journal d'un curé de campagne	Diary of a Country Priest	Yes	Yes	
1956	Un condamné à mort s'est échappé ou Le vent souffle où il veut	A Man Escaped a literal translation is, "a man condemned to death has escaped, or, the wind blows where it will"	Yes	Yes	
1959	Pickpocket	–	Yes	Yes	
1962	Procès de Jeanne d'Arc	The Trial of Joan of Arc	Yes	Yes	
1966	Au hasard Balthazar	Balthazar, at random	Yes	Yes	
1967	Mouchette	–	Yes	Yes	
1969	Une femme douce	A Gentle Woman	Yes	Yes	
1971	Quatre Nuits d'un rêveur	Four Nights of a Dreamer	Yes	Yes	
1974	Lancelot du Lac	Lancelot of the Lake	Yes	Yes	
1977	Le Diable probablement	The Devil Probably	Yes	Yes	
1983	L'Argent	Money	Yes	Yes	

=== Bibliography ===
- Notes sur le Cinématographe (1975)—translated as Notes on Cinematography, Notes on the Cinematographer and Notes on the Cinematograph in different English editions.
- Bresson on Bresson: Interviews, 1943–1983 (2016)—translated from the French by Anna Moschovakis, edited by Mylène Bresson, preface by Pascal Mérigeau.

== Awards and nominations ==
=== Cannes Film Festival ===
Year	Category	Nominated work	Result	Ref.
1957	Palme d'Or	A Man Escaped	Nominated	
1957	Best Director	A Man Escaped	Won	
1962	Palme d'Or	The Trial of Joan of Arc	Nominated	
1962	Jury Special Prize	The Trial of Joan of Arc	Won	
1962	OCIC Award	The Trial of Joan of Arc	Nominated	
1967	Palme d'Or	Mouchette	Nominated	
1967	OCIC Award	Mouchette	Won	
1967	Special Distinction	Mouchette	Won	
1974	FIPRESCI Prize	Lancelot du Lac	Nominated	
1983	Palme d'Or	L'Argent	Nominated	
1983	Best Director	L'Argent	Won	

=== Berlin Film Festival ===
Year	Category	Nominated work	Result	Ref.
1960	Golden Bear	Pickpocket	Nominated	
1971	Golden Bear	Four Nights of a Dreamer	Nominated	
1971	OCIC Award	Four Nights of a Dreamer	Won	
1977	Golden Bear	The Devil Probably	Nominated	
1977	Silver Bear Grand Jury Prize	The Devil Probably	Won	
1977	OCIC Award	The Devil Probably	Won	
1977	Interfilm Award	The Devil Probably	Won	

=== Venice Film Festival ===
Year	Category	Nominated work	Result	Ref.
1951	Golden Lion	Diary of a Country Priest	Nominated	
1951	OCIC Award	Diary of a Country Priest	Won	
1951	International Award	Diary of a Country Priest	Won	
1951	Italian Film Critics Award	Diary of a Country Priest	Won	
1966	Golden Lion	Au hasard Balthazar	Nominated	
1966	OCIC Award	Au hasard Balthazar	Won	
1966	San Giorgio Prize	Au hasard Balthazar	Won	
1966	New Cinema Award	Au hasard Balthazar	Won	
1966	Jury Homage	Au hasard Balthazar	Won	
1966	Cineforum 66 Award	Au hasard Balthazar	Won	
1967	Pasinetti Award	Mouchette	Won	
1989	Career Golden Lion Award	—N/a	Won	

== See also ==
- Robert Bresson Prize
