= Notes on the Cinematographer =

1975 book

- Author: Robert Bresson
- Original title: Notes sur le cinématographe
- Translator: Jonathan Griffin
- Language: French
- Publisher: Éditions Gallimard
- Publication date: 5 March 1975
- Publication place: France
- English publication date: 1977, 1986, 1997, 2016
- Pages: 139

Notes on the Cinematographer (French: Notes sur le cinématographe, a.k.a. Notes on Cinematography and Notes on the Cinematograph) is a 1975 book by the French filmmaker Robert Bresson. It collects Bresson's reflections on cinema written as short aphorisms.

J. M. G. Le Clézio wrote a preface for the 1988 edition. The book was first published in English in 1977, translated by Jonathan Griffin.

== Principles of filmmaking ==
Among the fundamental filmmaking principles advocated for in the book, Bresson argues that "cinematography" (French: le cinématographe) is the highest, even a transcendent, function of cinema. While a conventional movie is in essence "only" filmed theatre that privileges the performances of "actors", cinematography is an attempt to create a new language of moving images and sounds that incorporates what he calls "models" instead of actors. He succinctly defines the difference between the two:

HUMAN MODELS: movement from the exterior to the interior...
ACTORS: movement from the interior to the exterior.

When Bresson created films he instructed his actors not to perform, but just to be. He was notorious for requiring his models to repeat lines dozens of times until all "acting" was drained from them. Film critic Roger Ebert wrote that Bresson's directorial style resulted in films "of great passion: Because the actors didn't act out the emotions, the audience could internalize them."

== Reception ==
Publishers Weekly wrote in 1986: "The casual but succinct observations, presented here three or four to a page, consist of short paragraphs or single sentences. ... All demonstrate a scintillating curiosity and quest for perfection."

In a 2020 British Film Institute poll, Notes on the Cinematographer was ranked the second greatest book about film.

== English-language editions ==
English-language editions have been published under a variety of titles. Chronologically, they are:

- 1977: Notes on Cinematography, translated by Jonathan Griffin (New York: Urizen Books)
- 1986: Notes on the Cinematographer, with an introduction by J. M. G. Le Clézio, translated by Jonathan Griffin (London: Quartet Books)
- 1997: Notes on the Cinematographer, translated by Jonathan Griffin (Green Integer)
- 2016: Notes on the Cinematograph, translated by Jonathan Griffin (New York: New York Review Books)
