= L'Argent (1983 film) =

1983 film directed by Robert Bresson

- Theatrical release poster
- Directed by: Robert Bresson
- Written by: Robert Bresson
- Based on: The Forged Coupon by Leo Tolstoy
- Produced by: Jean-Marc Henchoz; Daniel Toscan du Plantier
- Starring: Christian Patey; Vincent Risterucci; Caroline Lang
- Cinematography: Pasqualino De Santis; Emmanuel Machuel
- Edited by: Jean-François Naudon
- Production companies: Marion's Films; FR 3 EOS Films
- Distributed by: AMLF
- Release date: 18 May 1983 (France)
- Running time: 83 minutes
- Countries: France; Switzerland
- Language: French

L'Argent (French pronunciation: [laʁ.ʒɑ̃], meaning "money") is a 1983 French tragedy film written and directed by Robert Bresson. The film is loosely inspired by the first part of Leo Tolstoy's posthumously published 1911 novella The Forged Coupon. It was Bresson's last film and won the Director's Prize at the 1983 Cannes Film Festival.

== Plot ==
A young man, Norbert, enters his father's study to claim his monthly allowance. His father obliges, but Norbert presses for more, citing a debt he owes a schoolmate. The father dismisses him, and an appeal to his mother fails. Norbert tries to pawn his watch to a friend, who instead gives him a forged 500-franc note.

The boys take the counterfeit to a photo shop and use it to purchase a picture frame. When the store's co-manager finds out, he scolds his partner for her gullibility. She chides him in return for having accepted two forged notes the previous week. He then decides to pass off all three forged notes at the next opportunity. He uses them to pay Yvon for delivering heating oil.

Yvon tries to pay his restaurant tab with the forged notes, but the waiter recognizes them as counterfeit. Yvon is arrested, and the photo shop people lie at his court trial. Yvon avoids jail time, but he loses his job.

One of the owners of the photo shop recognizes Norbert on the street with a group of his school friends, and she approaches the school authorities and complains to them about him. When the Chaplain quizzes some of the students about the counterfeit bills, Norbert leaves the classroom. At home, his mother advises him to deny everything, and she goes to the photo shop with a bribe for the owners to let the matter rest.

Lucien, the photo shop assistant who committed perjury for his employers at the trial by refusing to recognize Yvon, is revealed to have been marking up prices while his employers are out of the shop and pocketing the difference. His scam is discovered, and he is fired, but he keeps a copy of the shop's keys. He and two friends rob the shop's safe and begin an ATM card skimming operation.

In need of money, Yvon acts for a friend as the driver of a getaway car for bank robbers. The police foil the robbery and arrest Yvon, who is tried and sentenced to three years in prison. While there, Yvon learns of his daughter's death and his wife's decision to start a new life without him. He unsuccessfully attempts suicide.

Lucien and his accomplices are eventually arrested, and Lucien is sent to the same prison as Yvon. Lucien offers to include Yvon in a prison break attempt, but Yvon refuses. Yvon blames Lucien for his troubles and wants revenge. Lucien proceeds with his escape plan, but Yvon and his cellmate hear commotion in the hallway that indicates that Lucien has been caught. Yvon's cellmate speculates that Lucien will probably be transferred to a more severe maximum-security prison.

After being released from prison, Yvon murders and robs a pair of hotel keepers. He is taken in by a kind woman over the objection of her father. Some time passes, and one night Yvon kills them along with others in their house with an axe. He goes to a café, confesses to a police officer, and is arrested.

== Cast ==
- Christian Patey as Yvon Targe
- Vincent Risterucci as Lucien
- Caroline Lang as Elise
- Sylvie Van Den Elsen as elderly lady
- Michel Briguet as father of elderly lady
- Béatrice Tabourin as female photographer
- Didier Baussy as male photographer
- Marc Ernest Fourneau as Norbert
- André Cler as Norbert's father
- Claude Cler as Norbert's mother
- Bruno Lapeyre as Martial

== Production ==
Bresson first began work on the film's script in 1977. It is based on Leo Tolstoy's The Forged Coupon. Bresson later said that it was the film "with which I am most satisfied—or at least it is the one where I found the most surprises when it was complete—things I had not expected."

== Reception ==
The film was released in France on 18 May 1983 through AMLF, with subsequent releases distributed by mk2 Diffusion.

=== Critical response ===
Vincent Canby wrote in The New York Times, "That Robert Bresson [...] is still one of the most rigorous and talented film makers of the world is evident with the appearance of his beautiful, astringent new film, L'Argent. [...The film] would stand up to Marxist analysis, yet it's anything but Marxist in outlook. It's far too poetic – too interested in the mysteries of the spirit."

Tom Milne found L′Argent to be "unmistakably a masterpiece", noting "the extraordinary apotheosis of the final sequence," and the "breathless wonderment in the last shot of onlookers frozen as they gaze into the empty room from which all evidence of crime has gone."

On review aggregator Rotten Tomatoes, the film holds a 97% approval rating based on 30 reviews, with an average rating of 8.5/10. The critics consensus states, "Economically told and sweeping in scope, Robert Bresson's swan song is a haunting indictment of money's destructive power." On Metacritic, the film has a score of 95 out of 100 based on six critics, indicating "universal acclaim".

In the 2022 Sight and Sound critic's poll to determine the greatest films of all time, L'Argent was tied for 169th place. In the director's poll, the film was tied for 72nd place.

=== Accolades ===
Year	Association	Category	Title	Result	Ref.
1983	Cannes Film Festival	Palme d'Or	Robert Bresson	Nominated	
1983	Cannes Film Festival	Director's Prize	Robert Bresson	Won	
1983	Cahiers Du Cinema	Best Film - Top 10	Robert Bresson	Yes	
1984	César Award	Best Sound	Jean-Louis Ughetto; Luc Yersin	Nominated	
1984	National Society of Film Critics	Best Film	Robert Bresson	3rd Place	
1984	National Society of Film Critics	Best Director	Robert Bresson	Won	

Bresson won the Director's Prize at the 1983 Cannes Film Festival, tied with Andrei Tarkovsky (who admired Bresson's works) for Nostalghia. L'Argent was nominated for Best Sound at the César Awards 1984. It won the 1984 National Society of Film Critics Award for Best Director.

== Bibliography ==
- Ciment, Michel. "I Seek Not Description But Vision: Robert Bresson on L’Argent." In Quandt, Robert Bresson, 2012.
- Hasumi, Shigehiko. "Led by the Scarlet Pleats: Bresson’s L’Argent." In Quandt, Robert Bresson, 2012.
- Jones, Kent. L’Argent. BFI Film Classics, 1999. ISBN 978-0-85170-733-4.
- ———. "A Stranger’s Posture: Notes on Bresson’s Late Films." In Quandt, Robert Bresson, 2012.
- Moravia, Alberto. "L’Argent." In Quandt, Robert Bresson, 2012.
- Quandt, James, ed. Robert Bresson (Revised). Indiana UP (Cinematheque Ontario Monographs), 2012. ISBN 978-0-9682969-5-0.
