= Droue-sur-Drouette =

- Commune
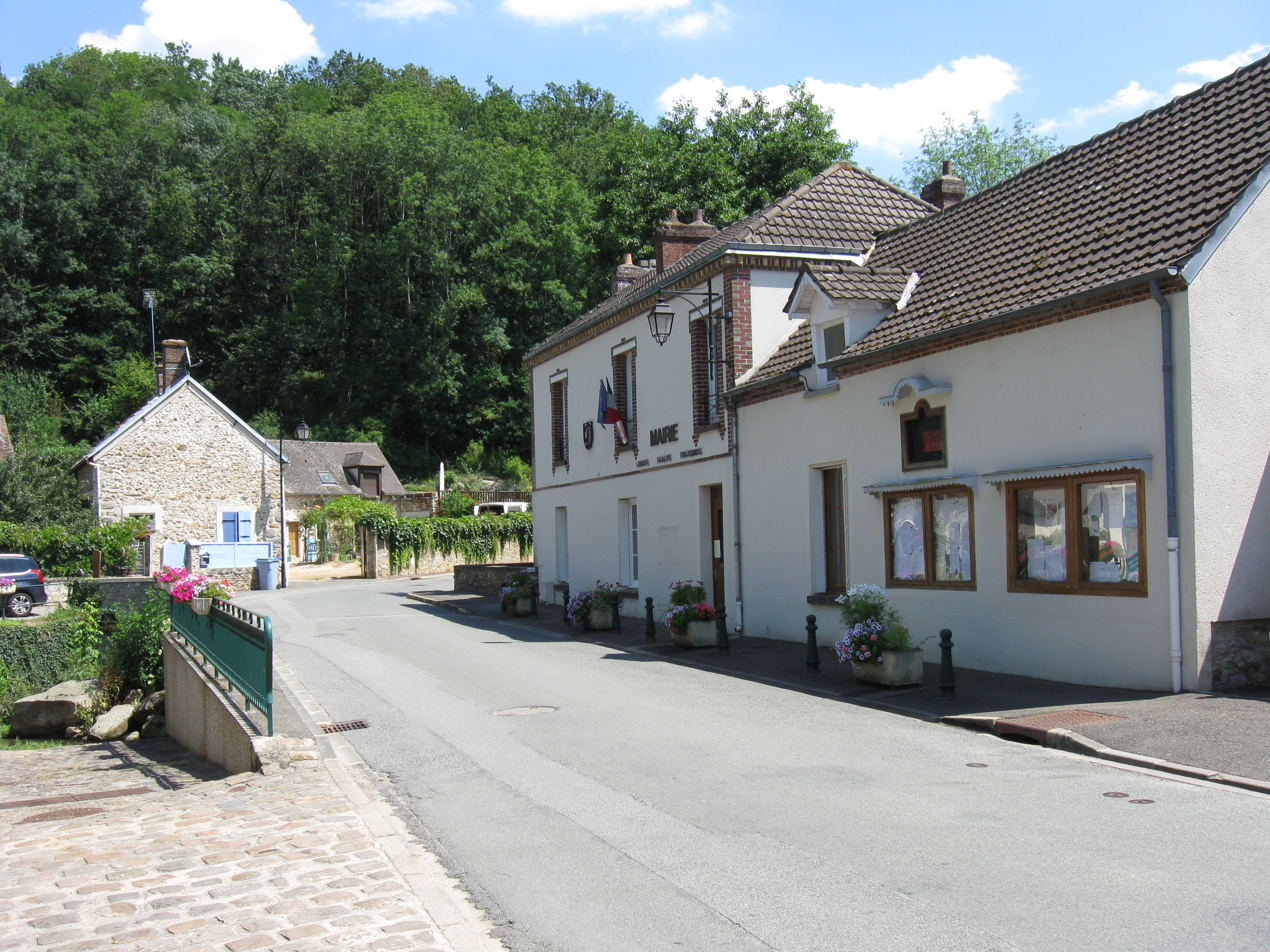
- The town hall in Droue-sur-Drouette
- Location of Droue-sur-Drouette
- Location within France Location within Centre-Val de Loire
- Coordinates: 48°36′06″N 1°42′09″E
- Country: France
- Region: Centre-Val de Loire
- Department: Eure-et-Loir
- Arrondissement: Chartres
- Canton: Épernon

Government
  - Mayor (2020–2026): Jean-François Buliard
- Area^{1}: 5.28 km^{2} (2.04 sq mi)
- Elevation: 1,231 m (4,039 ft)
- Highest elevation: 162 m (531 ft)
- Lowest elevation: 112 m (367 ft)
- Population (2023): 1,212
  - Density: 230/km^{2} (595/sq mi)
- Time zone: UTC+01:00 (CET)
  - Summer (DST): UTC+02:00 (CEST)
- INSEE/Postal code: 28135 /28230
- ^{1} French Land Register data, which excludes lakes, ponds, glaciers > 1 km^{2} (0.386 sq mi or 247 acres) and river estuaries.

Droue-sur-Drouette (French pronunciation: [dʁu syʁ dʁuɛt]) is a French commune in the department of Eure-et-Loir and the region of Centre-Val de Loire.

== Population ==
Historical population
Year	Pop.	±% p.a.
1968	373	—
1975	657	+8.42%
1982	849	+3.73%
1990	1,054	+2.74%
1999	1,123	+0.71%
2007	1,233	+1.17%
2012	1,267	+0.55%
2017	1,241	−0.41%
2023	1,212	−0.39%
Source: INSEE

== See also ==
- Communes of the Eure-et-Loir department
