= Bromont-Lamothe =

- Commune
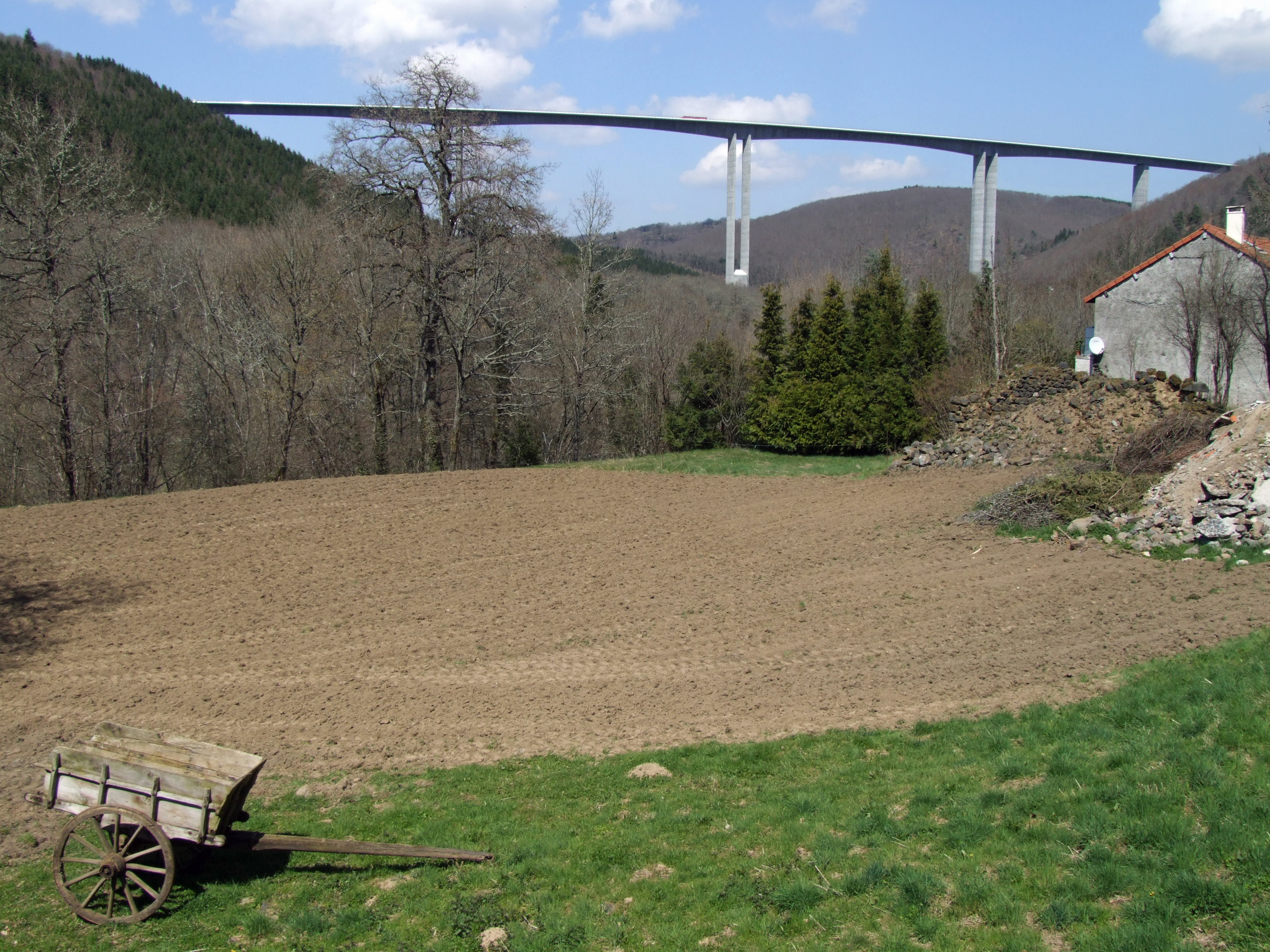
- The Sioule Viaduct in Bromont-Lamothe

- Coat of arms
- Location of Bromont-Lamothe
- Location within France Location within Auvergne-Rhône-Alpes
- Coordinates: 45°50′28″N 2°49′12″E
- Country: France
- Region: Auvergne-Rhône-Alpes
- Department: Puy-de-Dôme
- Arrondissement: Riom
- Canton: Saint-Ours
- Intercommunality: Chavanon Combrailles et Volcans

Government
  - Mayor (2026–32): Jean-Luc Fruchart
- Area^{1}: 38.07 km^{2} (14.70 sq mi)
- Elevation: 774 m (2,539 ft)
- Highest elevation: 906 m (2,972 ft)
- Lowest elevation: 574 m (1,883 ft)
- Population (2023): 1,032
  - Density: 27.11/km^{2} (70.21/sq mi)
- Time zone: UTC+01:00 (CET)
  - Summer (DST): UTC+02:00 (CEST)
- INSEE/Postal code: 63055 /63230
- ^{1} French Land Register data, which excludes lakes, ponds, glaciers > 1 km^{2} (0.386 sq mi or 247 acres) and river estuaries.

Bromont-Lamothe (French pronunciation: [bʁɔmɔ̃ lamɔt]) is a commune in the Puy-de-Dôme department in Auvergne-Rhône-Alpes in central France. It is the birthplace of the French film director Robert Bresson.

== Population ==
Historical population
Year	Pop.	±% p.a.
1968	721	—
1975	731	+0.20%
1982	736	+0.10%
1990	779	+0.71%
1999	766	−0.19%
2007	924	+2.37%
2012	979	+1.16%
2017	976	−0.06%
2023	1,032	+0.93%
Source: INSEE

== See also ==
- Communes of the Puy-de-Dôme department
